= Oppidum Lindenhof =

Ancient Celtic settlement in Zurich, Switzerland

Lindenhof
- estimated to be Turicum (Zurich)
- Lindenhof-Sihlbühl
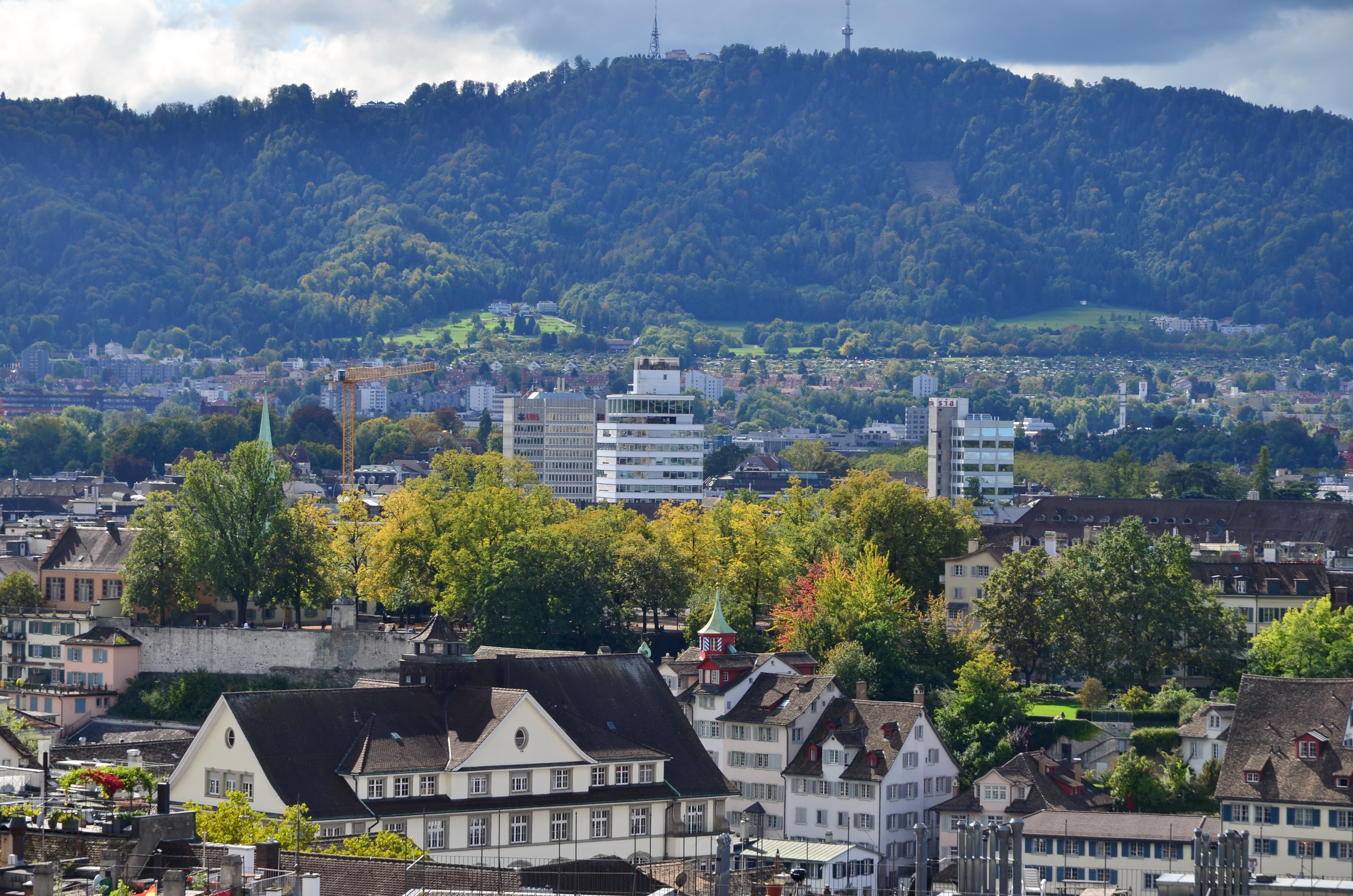
- Lindenhof hill and Schipfe as seen from Predigerkirche Zürich

- Location within Switzerland
- 47°22′22.74″N 8°32′26.04″E
- Type: section moats between district, minting, Circular rampart or Oppidum
- Periods: Iron Age
- Cultures: Celts, La Tène later Gallo-Roman
- Associated with: probably Helvetii, later Gallo-Roman
- Location: Lindenhof–Sihlbühl–Münsterhof
- Region: Zurich, Switzerland
- Part of: Turicum (Zurich)

History
- Built: c. 1st century BC
- Built by: Celts or probably Helvetii, later Roman

Site notes
- Material: stone, earth, wood
- Height: c. 28 metres (92 ft)
- Length: c. 350 metres (1,148 ft)
- Width: c. 250 metres (820 ft)
- Area: 10 hectares (25 acres)
- Excavation dates: 1906, 1989, 1997, 2004, 2007 and 2008
- Archaeologists: Margrit Balmer, Dölf Wild
- Condition: archaeological access
- Owner: City and canton of Zurich
- Public access: Yes

Lindenhof is the present name of the large fortified settlement, or oppidum, likely founded by the Helvetii on the Lindenhof hill on the western shore of the Limmat in Zurich, Switzerland.

== Geography ==
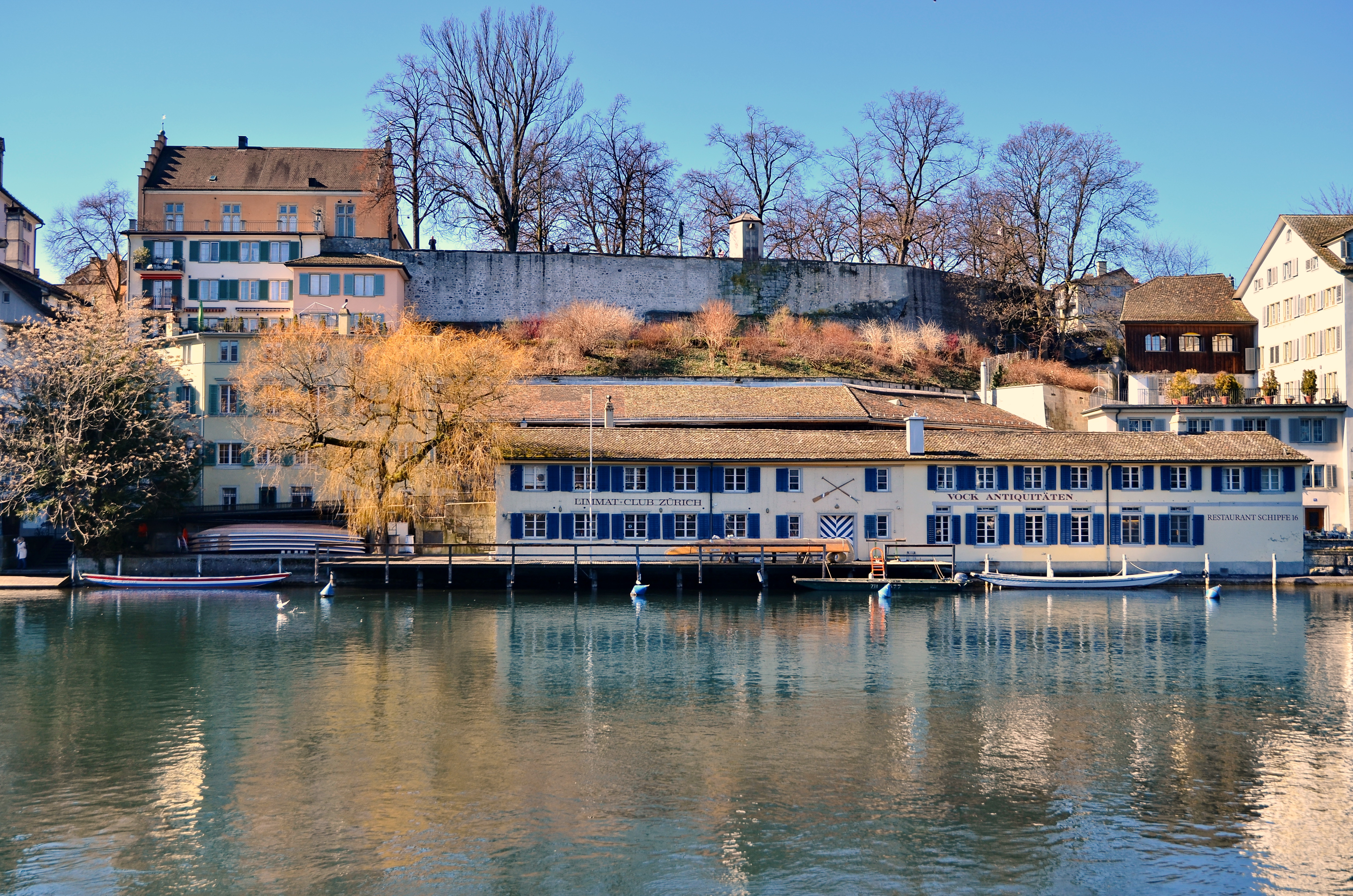
Lindenhof hill and Schipfe as seen from Limmatquai

The Lindenhof is a moraine hill that since the European Middle Ages is used as a public square, situated amidst the historic center of Zurich. It was the site of the Roman and Carolingian era Kaiserpfalz around which the modern city has historically grown. The hilltop area including its prehistoric, Celtic, Roman and medieval remains, therefore dominates the historical center alongside the easterly Limmat riverbank and the historical Schipfe quarter. Its northern part, where the former medieval Oetenbach nunnery was built at the site of a prehistoric cultic place at the present Uraniastrasse road, is called Sihlbühl, meaning the slope towards the Sihl river delta. At the same place, the Urania Sternwarte and Waisenhaus Zürich were built in 1901/02, and therefore important historical archaeological excavations never were done. To the south, near the St. Peter church hill, there was another cultic construction towards Münsterhof, and in the west, the hill is limited by the today's Rennweg—Bahnhofstrasse lanes, the site of the Helvetii accommodation and artisan district. The now largely flattened Lindenhof area elevates at 428 metres (1,404 ft) above sea level, and rises about 25 metres (82 ft) above the level of the Limmat at Schipfe—Limmatquai.

== History ==
=== Prehistory ===
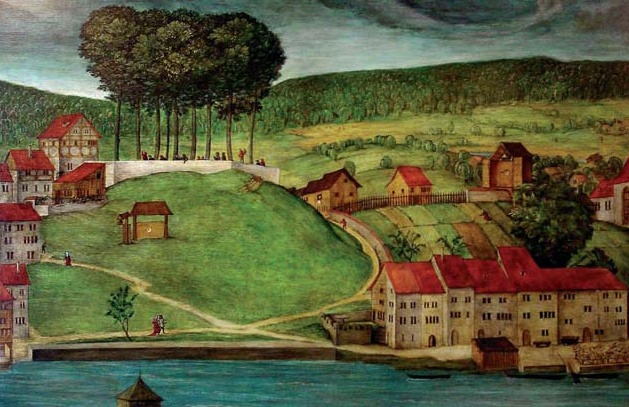
Lindenhof, Sihlbühl and Schipfe by Hans Leu d.Ä. in the probably 1490s

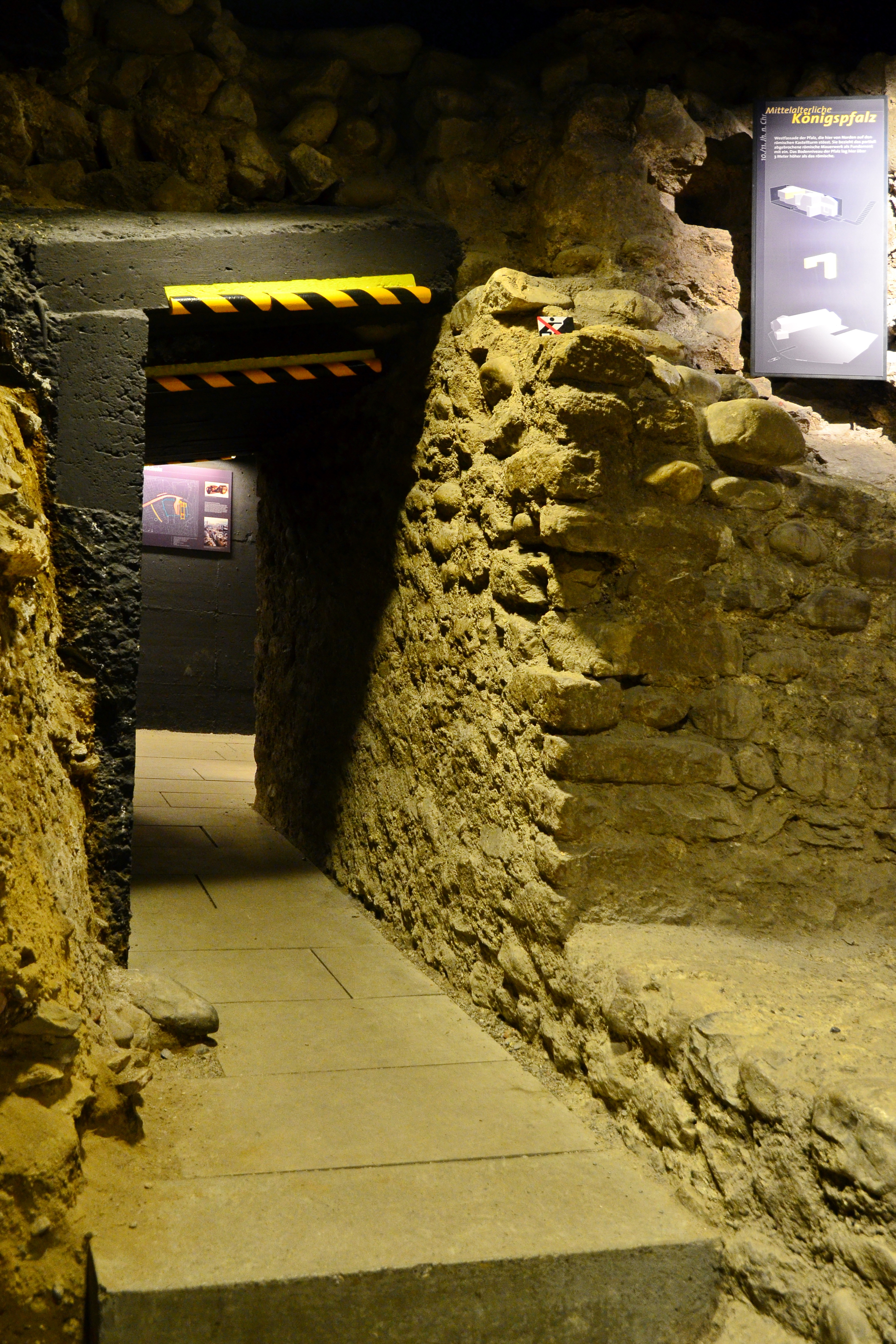
Celtic, Roman and medieval remains at Lindenhofkeller.

At the flat shore of Lake Zurich, there are Neolithic and Bronze Age (4500 to 850 BC) finds, most of them related to the lakeside settlements Kleiner Hafner and Grosser Hafner (both small former islands west of Sechseläutenplatz, near Bauschänzli at the Stadthausquai, and Alpenquai at the Bürkliplatz square. Lindenhof then was largely surrounded by water: until the early medieval area, the neighboring Münsterhof area was a swampy, by the Sihl river delta flooded hollow, so that Lindenhof hill was an optimal location for early probably fortified settlements. Middle Bronze Age (1500 BC) artefacts were found at Schipfe).

=== La Tène Culture ===
For the 1st century BC (La Tène culture), archaeologists excavated individual and aerial finds of the Celtic oppidum, whose remains were discovered in archaeological campaigns in the years 1989, 1997, 2004 and 2007 on Lindenhof and Rennweg, and also in the 1900s but mistakenly identified as Roman objects. Not yet archaeologically proven but suggested by historians, as well for the first construction of the today's Münsterbrücke Limmat crossing, the present Weinplatz square was the former civilian harbour of the Celtic-Roman Turicum, and so the term Weinplatz may have kept its ancient meaning wine square.

=== Vicus Turicum ===
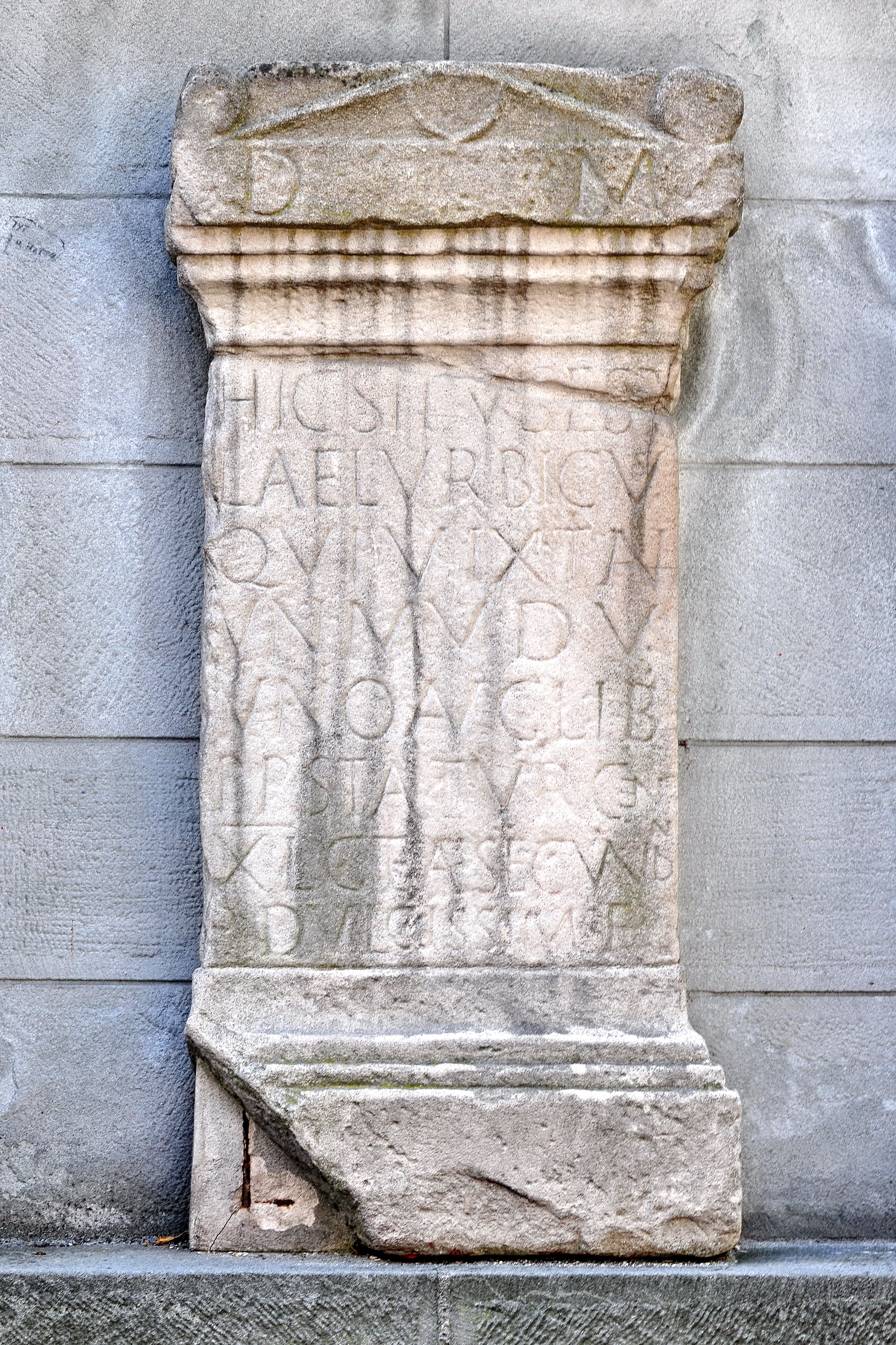
Lucius Aelius Urbicus' grave stone (200 AD) found at the upper part of the Pfalzgasse on Lindenhof hill

In 15 BC, Augustus' stepsons Drusus and later Emperor Tiberius Claudius Nero integrated the territory on the easterly shore of Lake Zurich into the Roman provinces Raetia and Germania Superior. Several stone buildings from the Roman period were located on and surrounding the hill. It was part of the small vicus Turicum, located on both banks of the Limmat, and connected by a Roman bridge located near the present Rathausbrücke–Weinplatz. Turicum, Zurich's Roman and possibly Celtic name, is engraved on the 2nd-century AD tombstone of a little boy. It was found on 15 May 1747, at Pfalzgasse lane leading to the St. Peter church, and refers to the Roman STA(tio) TUR(i)CEN(sis). Using the advantage of the local topography, the Roman military built a citadel on top of the hill in the years of the Roman emperor Valentinian I (364–375), to defend migrations from the north by the Alamanni. 4,500 square metres (48,438 sq ft) large, it was fitted with 10 towers and 2 metres (7 ft) wide walls.

=== Gallo-Roman settlement ===
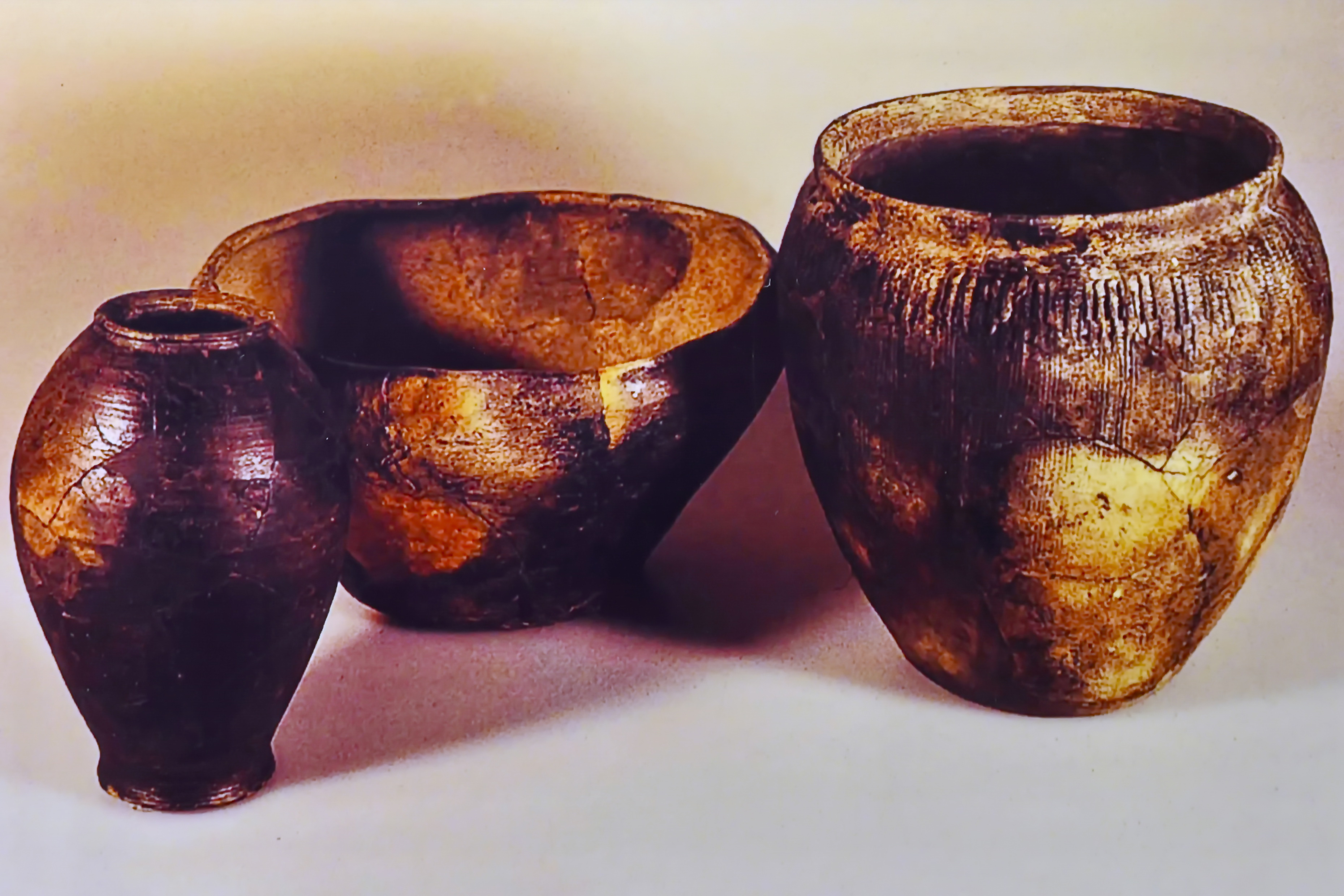
La Tène ceramics from the Lindenhof oppidum

Likely between the fifth and seventh centuries AD, the hilltop leveled fort became the retaining wall of the growing Gallo-Roman settlement, and so gave the Lindenhof terrace largely its current form. The remains of the Roman Castra were used as the center of the later fortification of the historical center of Zurich. Significant parts of the lime mortar and ancient castle wall are integrated into the town houses around the Lindenhof and in a Pfalz. The Gallo-Roman remains existed until the early European Middle Ages, when a Carolingian, later Ottonian Pfalz (1054) was built on its remains. This Kaiserpfalz was a long building with a chapel on the eastern side of the still fortified hill; it is last mentioned in 1172, and was derelict by 1218, when its remains were partly scavenged for construction of the city walls and stone masonry on private houses.

The Masonic lodge Modestia cum Libertate (MCL) bought in 1851 the so-called Paradies building, where coins, stove tiles and other artefacts from the Celtic, Roman and medieval times were found. The Celtic and Roman remains and foundation stones can be seen in the Lindenhofkeller at one's own risk by contacting Baugeschichtliches Archiv situated at Neumarkt, Zurich.

== Finds ==
=== Grosser Hafner sanctuary ===
During the reign of Emperor Hadrian, a round wooden temple as an island sanctuary was built at the Grosser Hafner island. The building was erected in 122 AD, and consisted of oak piles driven deep into the lake bottom, surrounded probably with walls made of perishable materials, which formed a circle of 7 metres (23 ft) in diameter. The rotunda is located on the former island settlement, about 500 metres (1,640 ft) away from the Vicus Turicum. The archaeological material indicates that the facility sure may was used up in the 3rd century AD, even up in the 4th century AD by the Gallo-Roman population. On the one hand, the interpretation as the temple is based on the insularity and the design, on the other hand on finds of coins; the majority of the now nearly 90 coins probably are from a so far not proven predecessor building, probably from the third quarter of the 1st century AD. An island sanctuary of the Helvetii in connection with the 1st century BC settlement oppidum may be assumed.

=== Potin coin lumps ===
On the occasion of construction works at the Alpenquai site, investigation conducted by probes and probing ditches occurred in 1970. Despite the dredging for the construction of the Seequai between 1916 and 1919, an amazingly big area of approximately 2.8 hectares (7 acres) with two cultural layers was preserved. Both, the upper and the lower cultural layer, were separated by an about 10 centimetres (3.94 in) cm thick layer of lake marl composed of several layers of different materials. There were found pile shoes at different altitudes in the cultural layers and rich bar decoration of ceramics occurred exclusively in the lower layer, while the decoration on cannelure groups was limited to the upper layer, as well as some graphite-decorated fragments. So-called Potin lumps, those largest weights 59.2 kilograms (131 lb), where found at Alpenquai in 1890. They consist of a large number of fused Celtic coins, which are mixed with charcoal remnants. Some of the about 18,000 coins originate from the Eastern Gaul, others are of the Zurich type, that were assigned to the local Helvetii, and date to around 100 BC. The find is so far unique, and the scientific research assumes that the melting down of the lumps was not completed, therefore the aim was to form cultic offerings. The site of the find was at that time at least 50 metres (164 ft) from the lake shore, and probably 1 metre (3 ft) to 3 metres (10 ft) deep in the water.

=== Individual finds ===
During the November 2007 excavation under the guidance of Margrit Balmerm, well plates were found that were used by the Celts for making money. Researchers believe that in the wells, small amounts of metal were melted thereby producing metal blanks, and the planchets were later used for coinage. The 1st century BC inhabitants of Celtic Zurich therefore lived in a settlement Turicum that was more significant than assumed before. A v-shaped Celtic ditch was also dug out, which was discovered a few years ago at the site of the former Oetenbach nunnery. It was probably not an external but an inner moat. This finding is important because the Celts of the late LaäTène period divided their settlements with trenches into different zones. As in other Celtic settlements, this moat marks the artisans' quarter, lodging for the nobilitas, cult districts and public spaces. Emil Vogt assumed in the 1960s for traces of an early Roman military system, which he put into context with the Roman Alps campaigns in 15 BC, and so the Celtic finds in the beginning have been classified as Roman finds. During the renovations at Rennweg in 1989, archaeologists discovered traces of a Celtic settlement for the first time. The significance of the findings was recognized, however, only when in sewer rehabilitation remains of Celtic buildings a few years later have been found. Since then, archaeologists have made further discoveries during excavations at the foot of the Lindenhof hill, whose scientific evaluation proves the Celtic settlement. Recent discoveries set older finds in a new light, and the interpretation of the research is still not succeeded, and therefore old finds will be re-interpreted.

== Heritage site of national significance ==
The hillside area is listed as in the Swiss inventory of cultural property of national and regional significance, including the remains of its prehistoric, Roman and medieval settlements respectively buildings as a Class A object.

== Literature ==
- Margrit Balmerm, Luisa Bertolaccini, Sabine Deschler-Erb, Stefanie Jacomet, Michael Nick, Hortensia von Roten, Katharina Schmid-Ott, Gisela Thierrin-Michael, Alexander Voûte, Dölf Wild, Werner Wild. Zürich in der Spätlatène- und frühen Kaiserzeit: Vom keltischen Oppidum zum römischen Vicus Turicum. Monographien der Kantonsarchäologie Zürich 39 (2009), Dissertation von Margrit Balmgern, Universität Bern (Prof. S. Martin-Kilcher), Zurich 2009, ISBN 978-3-905681-37-6.
- Dölf Wild: Die Zürcher City unter Wasser. Interaktion zwischen Natur und Mensch in der Frühzeit Zürichs. Stadt Zürich, Archäologie und Denkmalpflege 2006–2008.
- Margrit Balmer, Stefanie Martin-Kilcher, Dölf Wild: Kelten in Zürich. Der Ursprung der Stadt in neuem Licht - Stadtgeschichte und Städtebau in Zürich. In: Schriften zu Archäologie, Denkmalpflege und Stadtplanung, Voluma 2. Published by Amt für Städtebau der Stadt Zürich, Zurich 2001, ISBN 978-3-905384-01-7.
