= St. Peter, Zurich =

Church in the old town of Zurich, Switzerland

St. Peter Church of Zurich
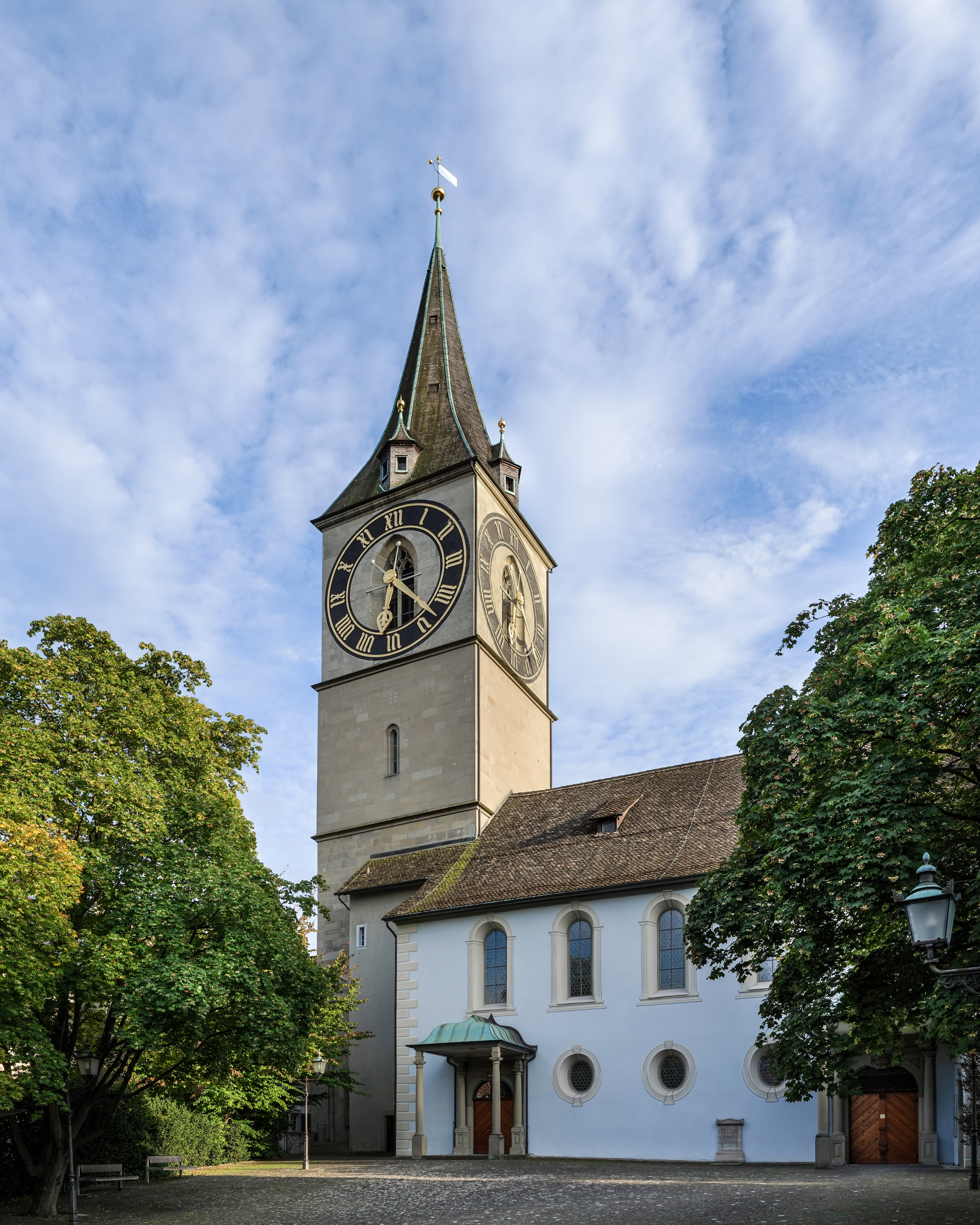
- St. Peter as seen from St. Peterhofstatt plaza (2014)

Religion
- Affiliation: Reformed
- District: Evangelical Reformed Church of the Canton of Zürich

Location
- Location: Zürich; Switzerland
- Interactive map of St. Peter Church of Zurich
- Coordinates: 47°22′16″N 8°32′27″E

Architecture
- Type: Church
- Completed: around 1000

St. Peter is one of the four main churches of the old town of Zurich, Switzerland, besides Grossmünster, Fraumünster and Predigerkirche.

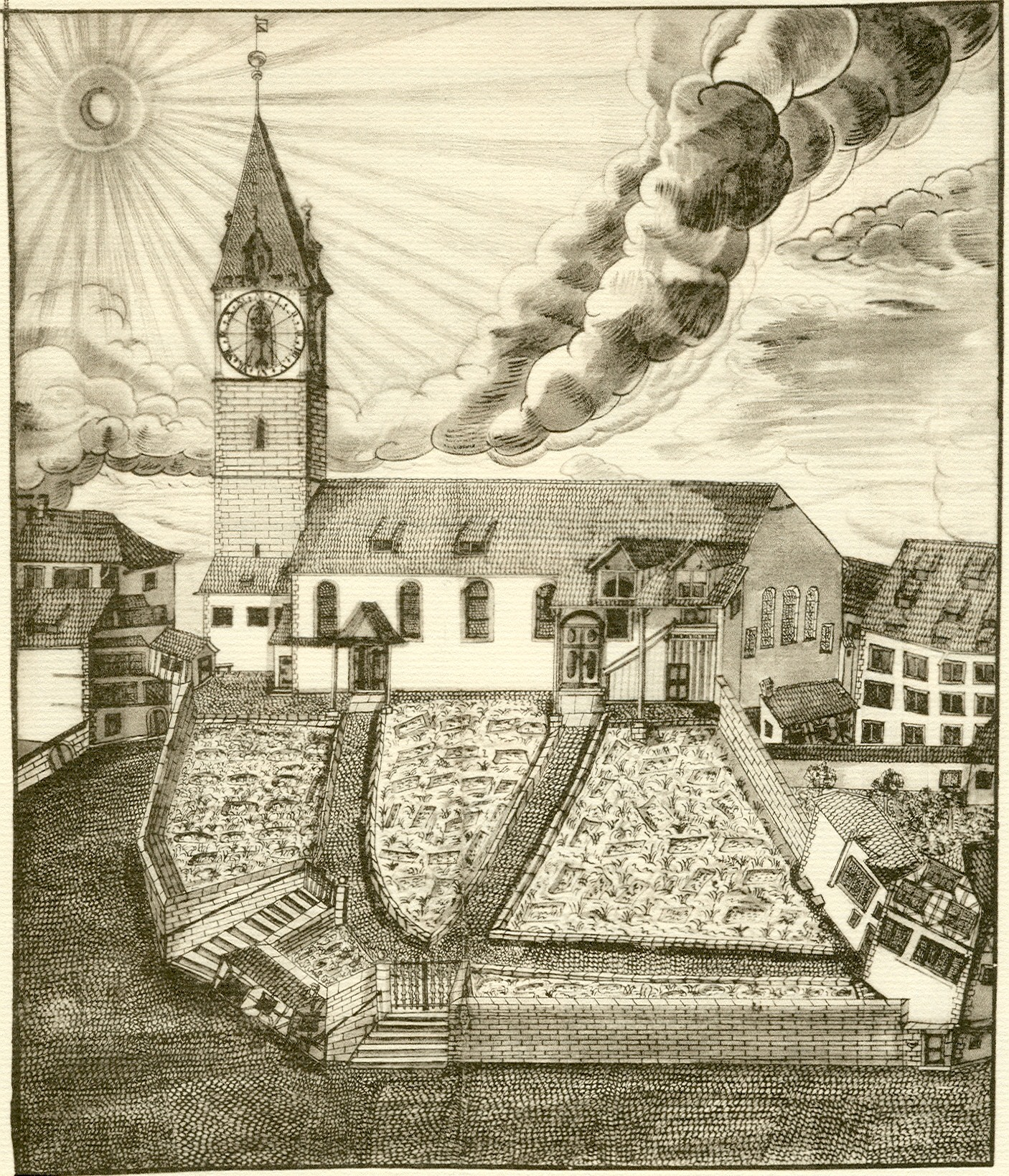
St. Peter in 1700 AD

== History ==
Located next to the Lindenhof hill, the site of the former Roman castle, the church was built on the site of a temple to Jupiter. An early church of 10 by 7 metres is archaeologically attested for the 8th or 9th century. This building was replaced by an early Romanesque church around AD 1000, in turn replaced in 1230 by a late Romanesque structure, parts of which survive. Rudolf Brun, the first independent mayor of the town, was buried here in 1360. The nave was rebuilt in 1460 in the Gothic style. Prior to the Reformation, St. Peter was the only parish church of the town, the rest being part of monasteries. The first reformed pastor, Leo Jud (1523–1542), was a friend of Huldrych Zwingli and contributed to the first translation of the Bible in Zurich. Johann Kaspar Lavater was pastor from 1778 to 1801. His gravestone can be seen in the church wall. Theologian Adolf Keller served as pastor from 1909 to 1924.

The current building was consecrated in 1706 as the first church built under Protestant rule. Its congregation forms part of the Evangelical Reformed Church of the Canton of Zurich. Until 1911, the steeple was manned by a fire watch. Restoration work was carried out in 1970 to 1975. The steeple's clock face has a diameter of 8.7 m (as of 2023, the largest church clock face in Europe). The bells date to 1880.

The church steeple is owned by the City of Zurich, while the nave is owned by the St. Peter parish of the Evangelical Reformed Church of the Canton of Zurich.

== Clock tower ==
The clock tower and the nave of St. Peter do not have the same owner: until the French Revolution the tower belonged to the former city republic of Zurich, since 1803 to the city of Zurich. Belfry and bells belong to the Reformed Church of the canton of Zurich, as well as the staircase leading to the tower.

The tower was primarily used for fire police duties, and 1340 AD the first fire guard was set in duty. In the pre- and early Romanesque area, St. Peter had no church tower; the first three-storey tower was built in early 13th century. The first floor with Romanesque ribbed vault dates back to that period. In 1450 the tower was increased to 64 metres (210 ft) (as of today) and a pitched (helmet) roof was attached. That 24-metre (79 ft) high part of the tower was in 1996 re-covered with 42,000 larch shingles from the Engadine valley, since then being the only wooden roof in Zurich.

Towards the end of the 13th century a mechanical church clock was installed. In 1366 it was renewed and got one only dial that was directed towards the Limmat and only displayed the hours. Around 1460, the sense of time has been refined by half on the quarter-hour strike, and in 1538 the striking clock was replaced, and all four facades got dials. Replacements of the clock mechanism followed in 1593–1594, 1675 and 1826. In 1844 a new movement with quarter-hour strike was installed; the electrification of the work was carried out in 1873. In 1972 the balance was replaced by a fully automatic master clock in the clock room of the St. Peter's tower, and in 1996 the electrified mechanical movement of 1844 was shut down and replaced by a central computer system. The clock tower of St. Peter was for centuries Zurich's 'official local time', and all public city clocks had to conform to it. The church clock of St. Peter has the second-largest tower clock face in Europe, the outer diameter of each of the four church clocks measures 8.64 metres (28.3 ft), the minute hand 5.73 metres (18.8 ft), the hour hand 5.07 metres (16.6 ft), and the minute crack of the large pointer measures 0.455 metres (1.5 ft).

=== Bells ===
The tower contains 5 bells in total, all cast by 1880 by Jakob Keller. In Switzerland, the bells are always numbered from largest to smallest, Bell 1 is always the tenor or bourdon.

Bell Number	Bell Name	Bell Name (English)	Weight (KG)
1	Totenglocke	Death Bell (Bourdon)	6203
2	Ruf- und Elfuhrglocke	Calling and eleven o'clock bell	2573
3	Betzeitglocke	Prayer bell	1445
4	Sturmglocke	Storm bell	582
5	Taufglocke	Baptismal bell	312

== Pipe organ ==
The pipe organ was installed in 1974 by Mühleisen Manufacture d’orgues from Strasbourg. It was revised in 1992, 1994 and 1997.

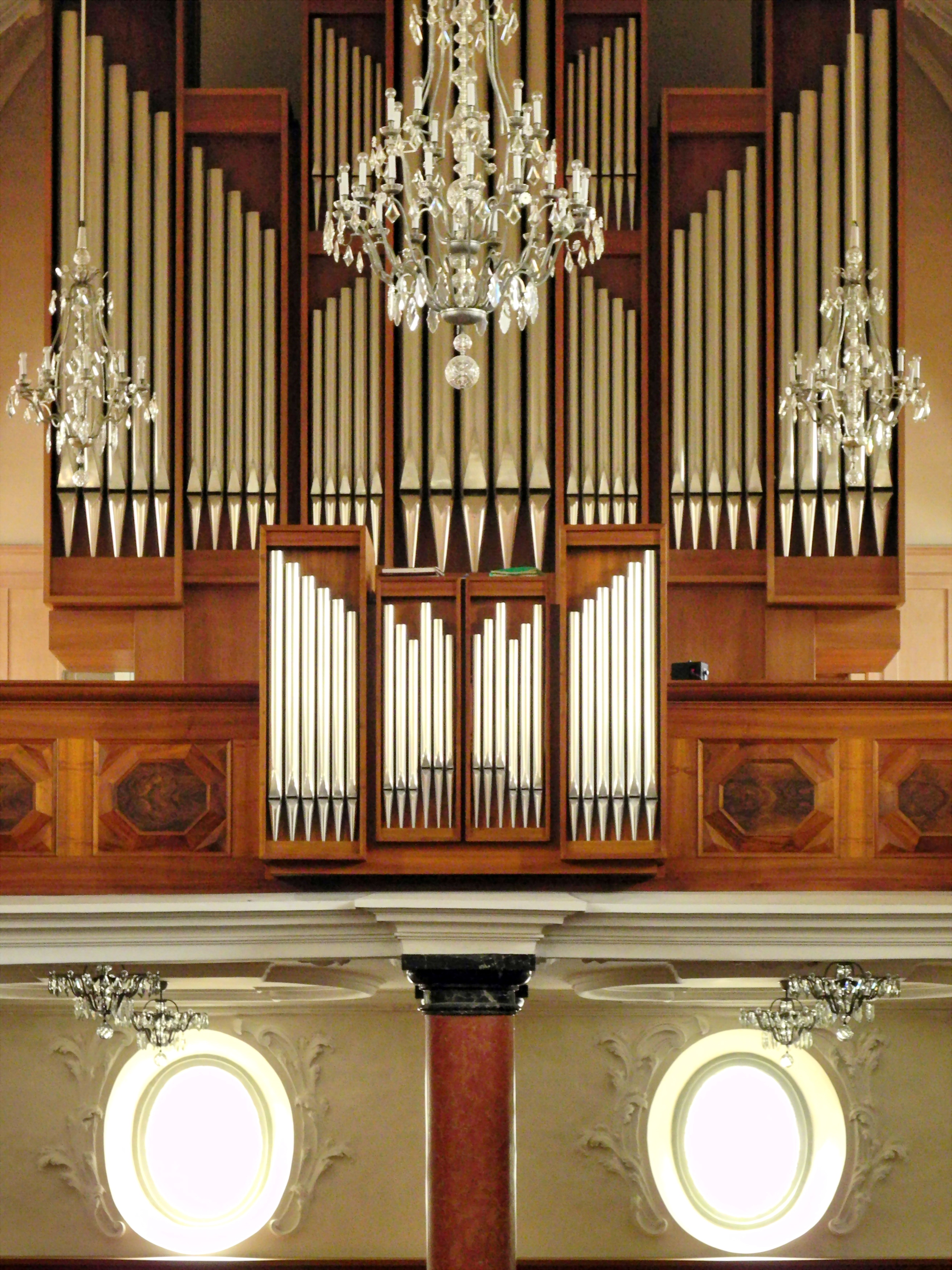
Organ

I Main C–g^{3}
Principal	16'
Principal	8'
Rohrgedackt	8'
Gemshorn	8'
Octave	4'
Flöte	4'
Superoctave	2'
Cornett (5f)	8'
Mixtur (4-5f)	2'
Scharf	1'
Trompete	8'
Clairon	4'

II Rückpositiv C–g^{3}
Suavial	8'
Gedackt	8'
Salicional	8'
Prinzipal	4'
Rohrflöte	4'
Flautino	2'
Gemsquinte	1^{1}/_{3}′
Octave	1'
Zimbel (3f)	^{2}/_{3}′
Krummhorn	8'
Schalmey	4'
Tremulant

III Swell C–g^{3}
Gedackt	16'
Principal	8'
Koppelflöte	8'
Flûte harmonique	8'
Zartgedeckt	8'
Viola da Gamba	8'
Voix Céleste	8'
Octave	4'
Flöte	4'
Nasard	2^{2}/_{3}′
Octave	2'
Terz	1^{3}/_{5}′
Mixtur (5f)	1^{1}/_{3}′
Bombarde	16'
Trompete	8'
Oboe	8'
Clairon	4'
Tremulant

Pedal C–g^{1}
Principalbass	16'
Subbass	16'
Gedecktbass	16'
Principal	8'
Spitzflöte	8'
Gedcktbass	8'
Octave	4'
Nachthorn	2'
Mixtur (3f)	4'
Posaune	16'
Trompete	8'
Clairon	4'

The slider chests instrument has 52 registers on three manuals and 32 pedals.

== St. Peterhofstatt ==
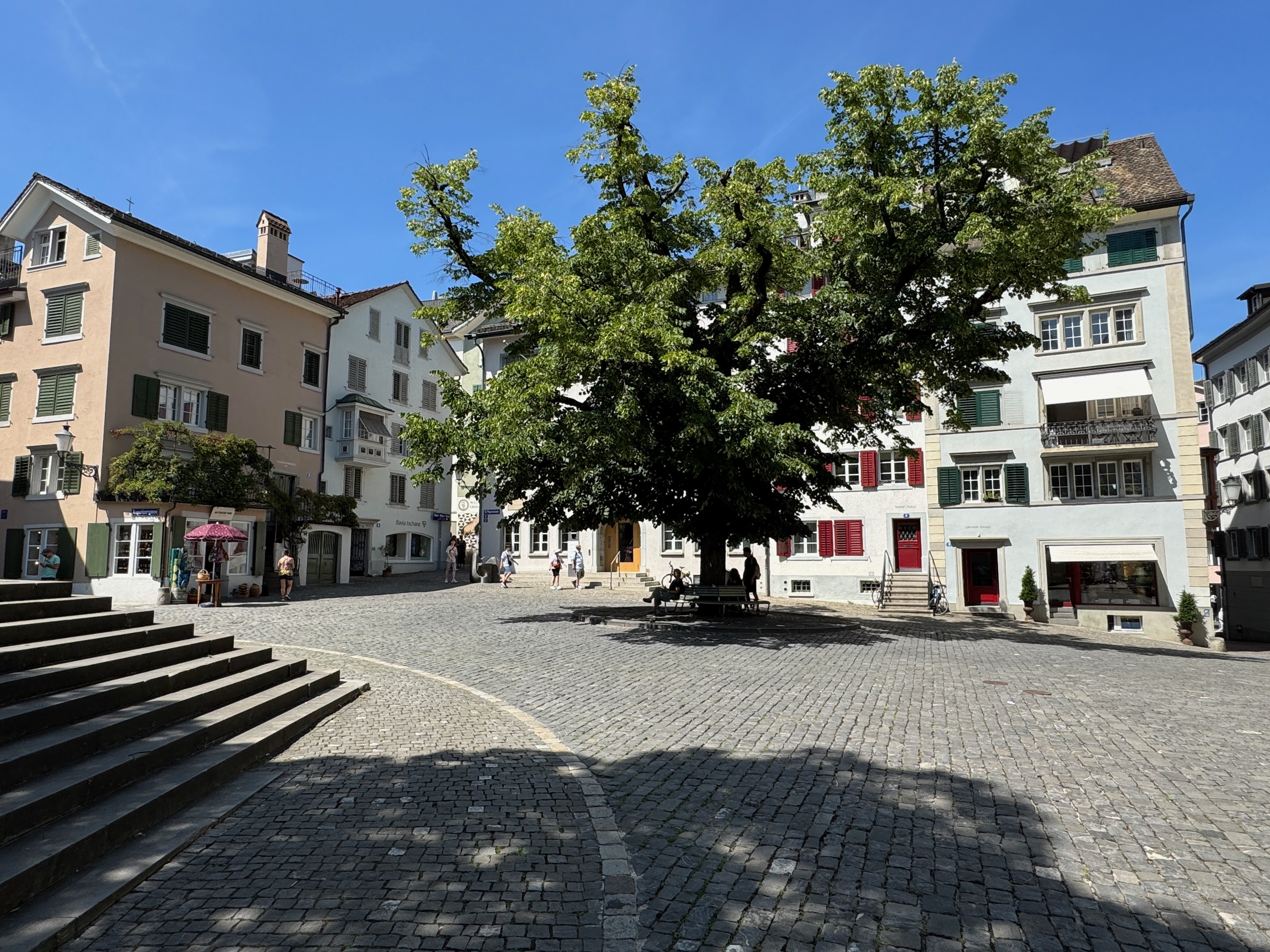
St. Peterhofstatt, looking northwest (2024)

Around the 1st century BC La Tène culture, archaeologists excavated individual and aerial finds of the Celtic-Helvetii oppidum Lindenhof, whose remains were discovered in archaeological campaigns in the years 1989, 1997, 2004 and 2007 on Lindenhof, Münsterhof and Rennweg-Augustinergasse, and also in the 1900s, but the finds mistakenly were identified as Roman objects. Not yet archaeological proven but suggested by the historians, as well for the first construction of the today's Münsterbrücke Limmat crossing, the present Weinplatz square was the former civilian harbour of the Celtic-Roman Turicum.

Assumed to be the oldest parish church of Zurich, St. Peterhofstatt is St. Peter's adjoint plaza, analogously meaning the royal court at St. Peter.

== Gallery ==
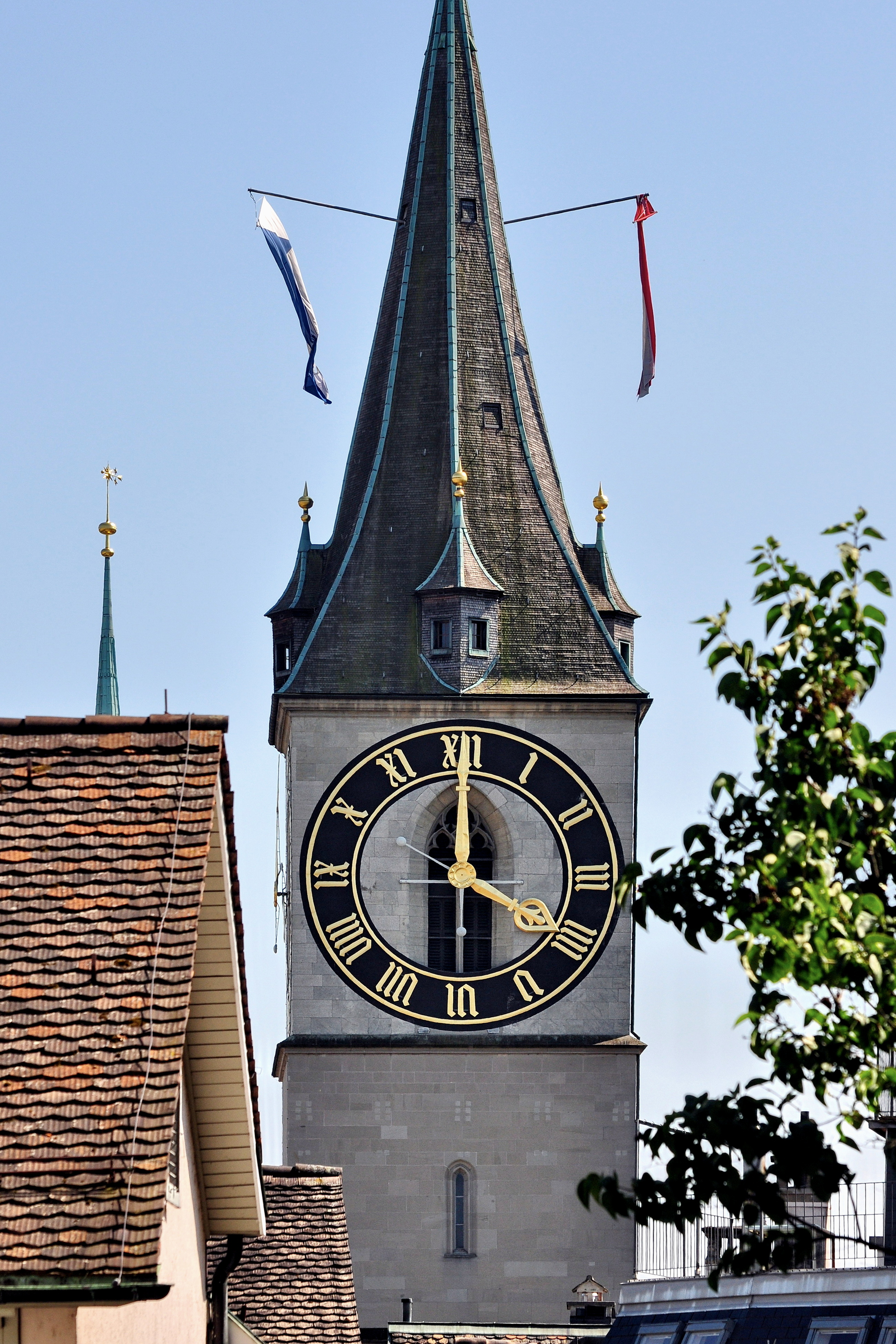
The church tower as seen from the Lindenhof hill

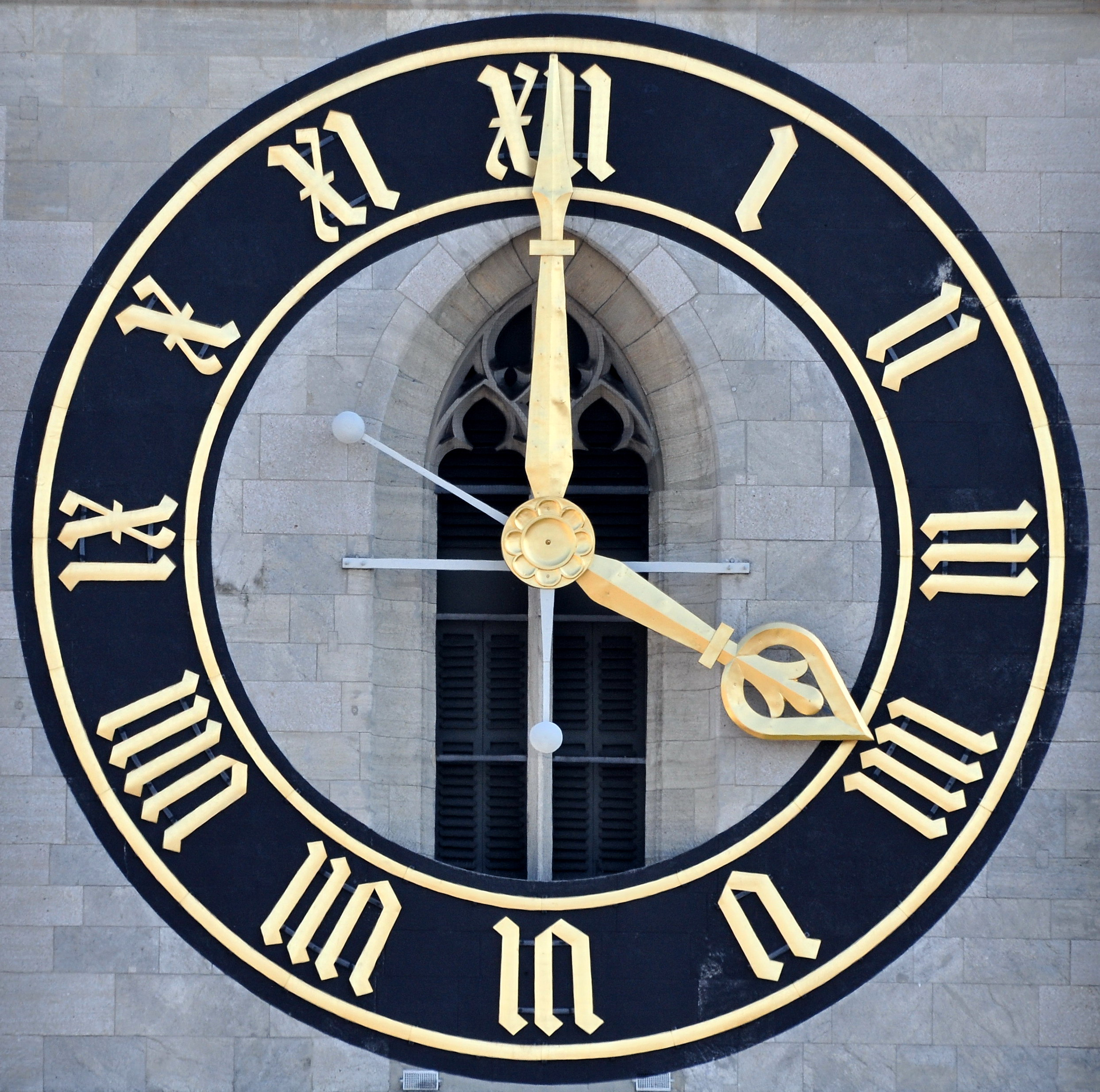
Europe's largest church clock face

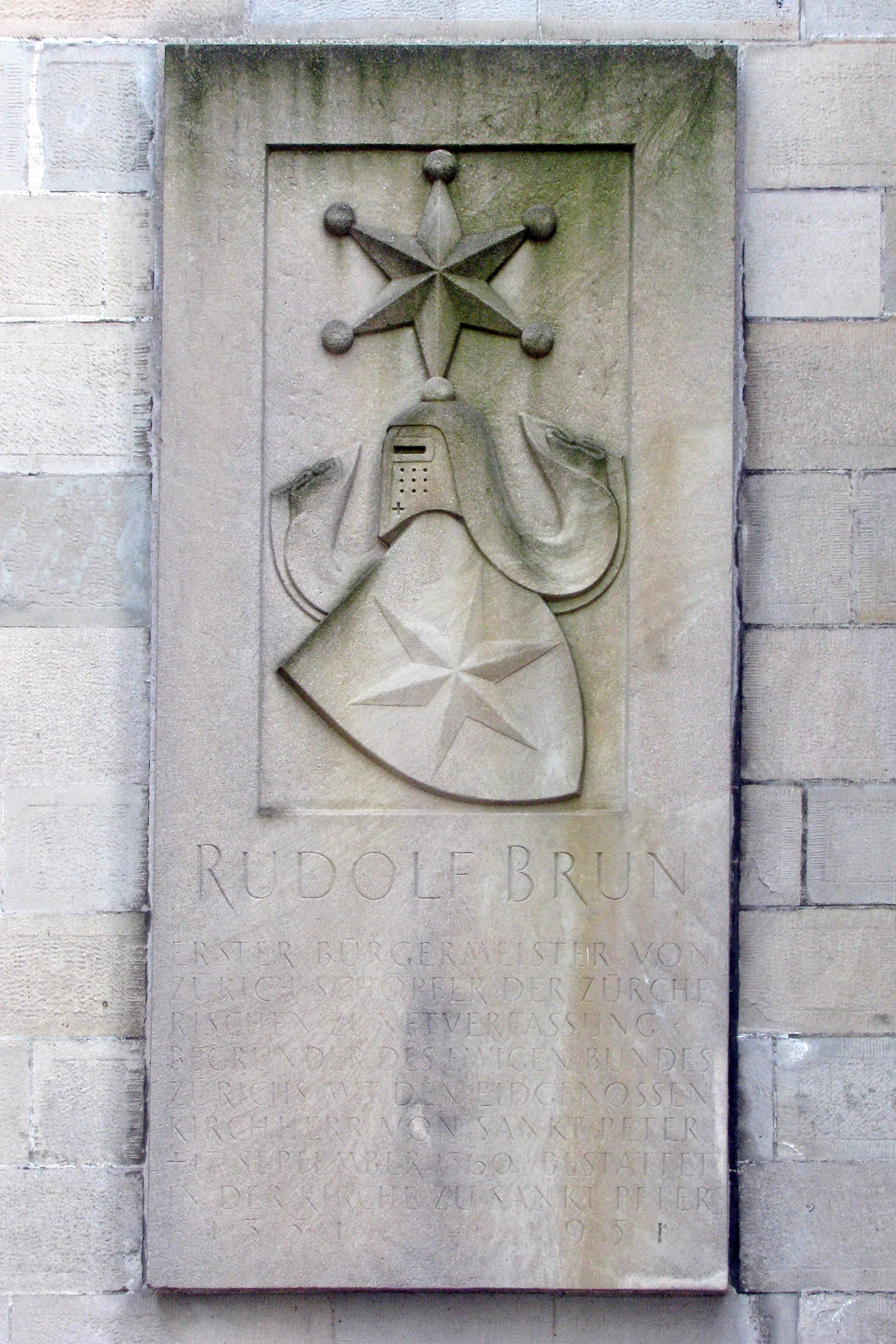
Rudolf Brun's gravestone

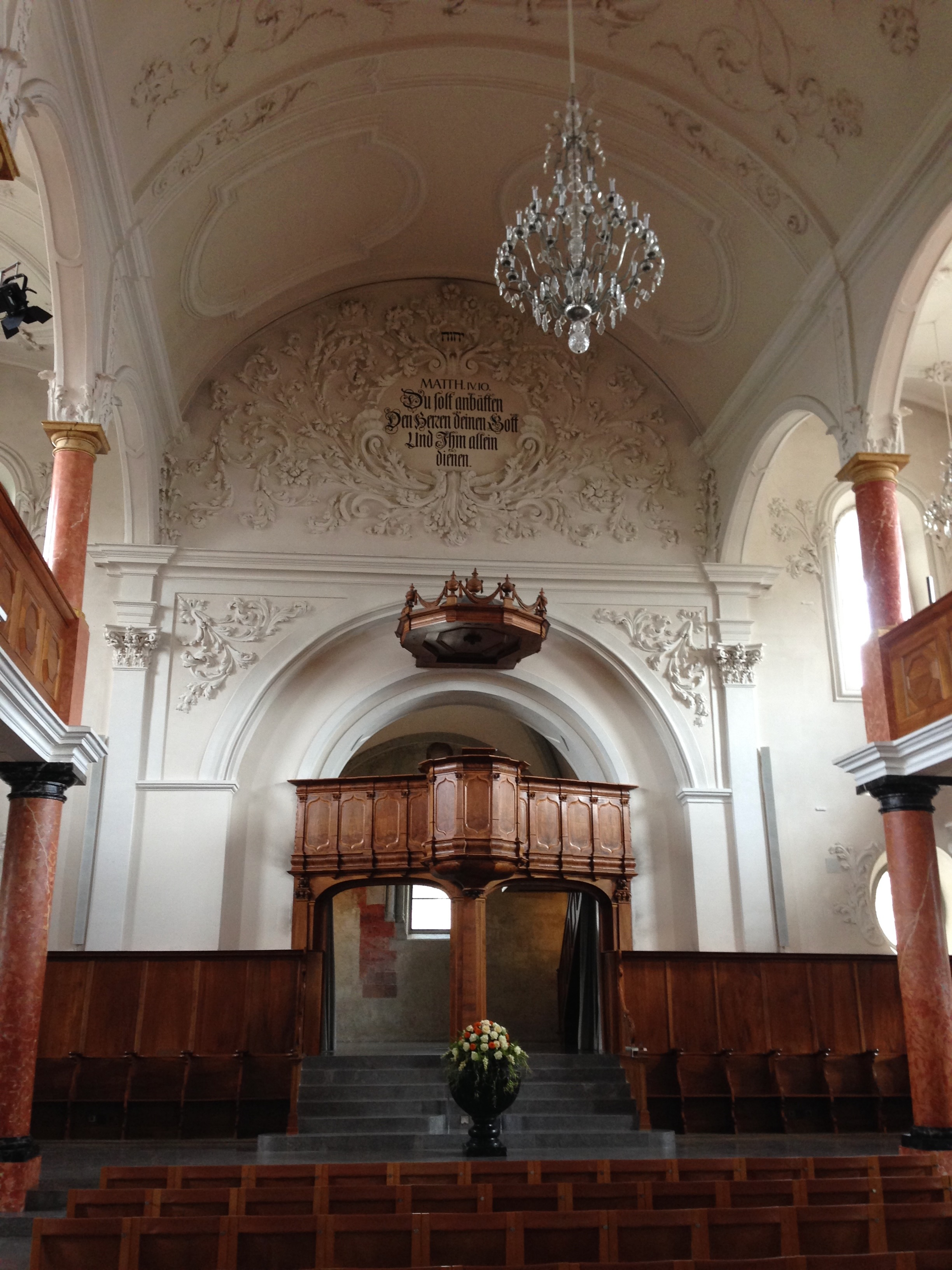
The nave towards the apse

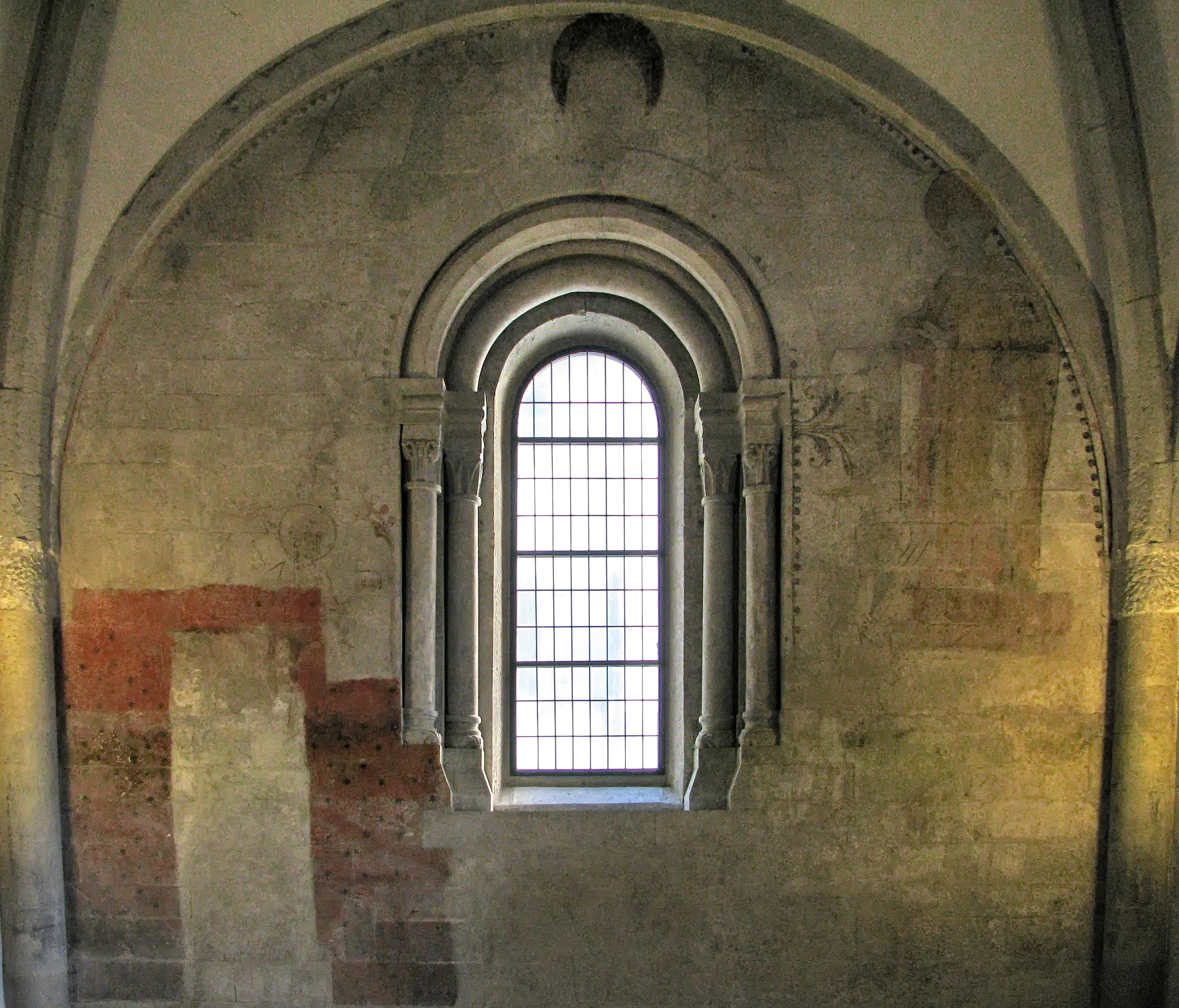
Remains of the fresco inside the apse

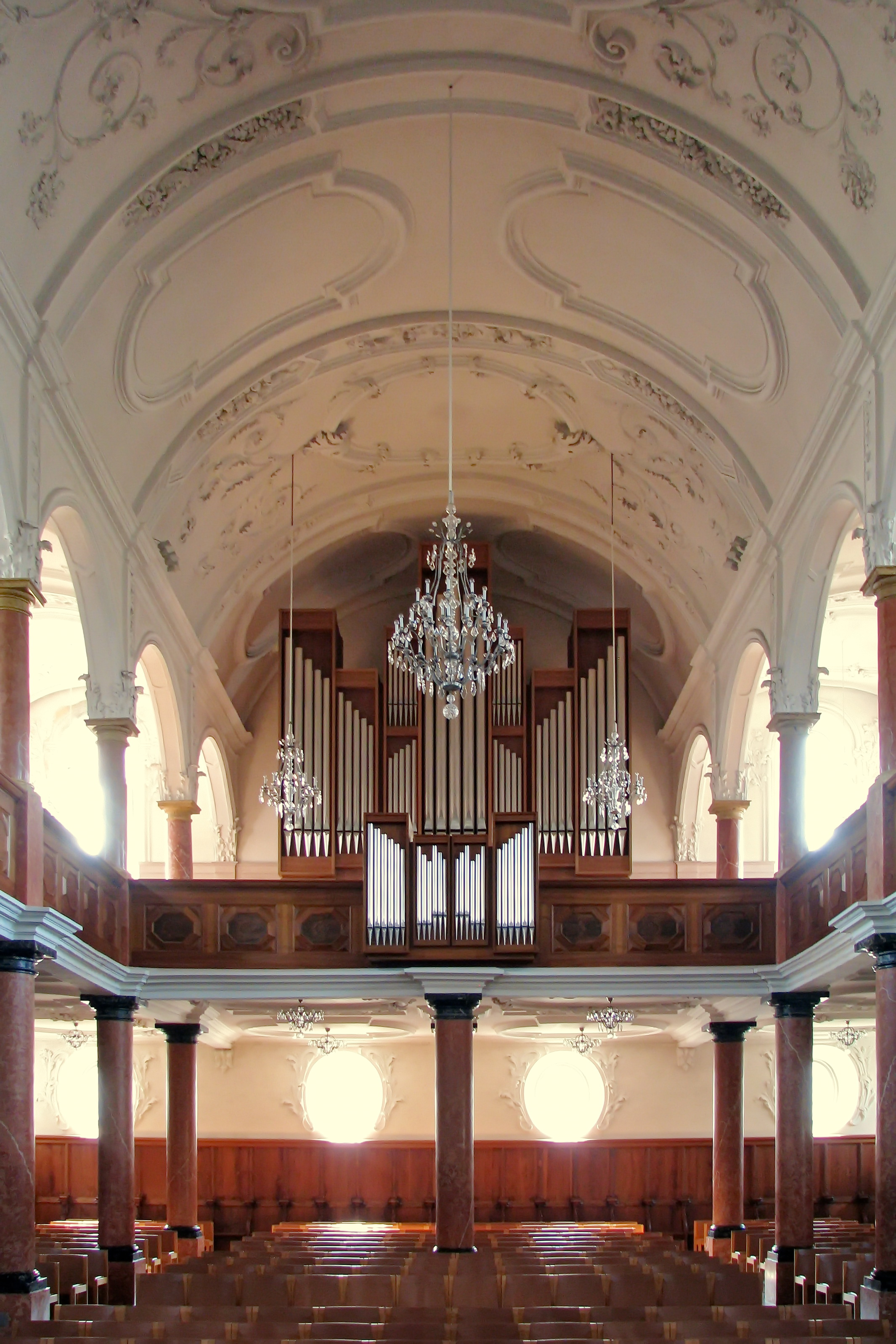
The church organ and ceiling

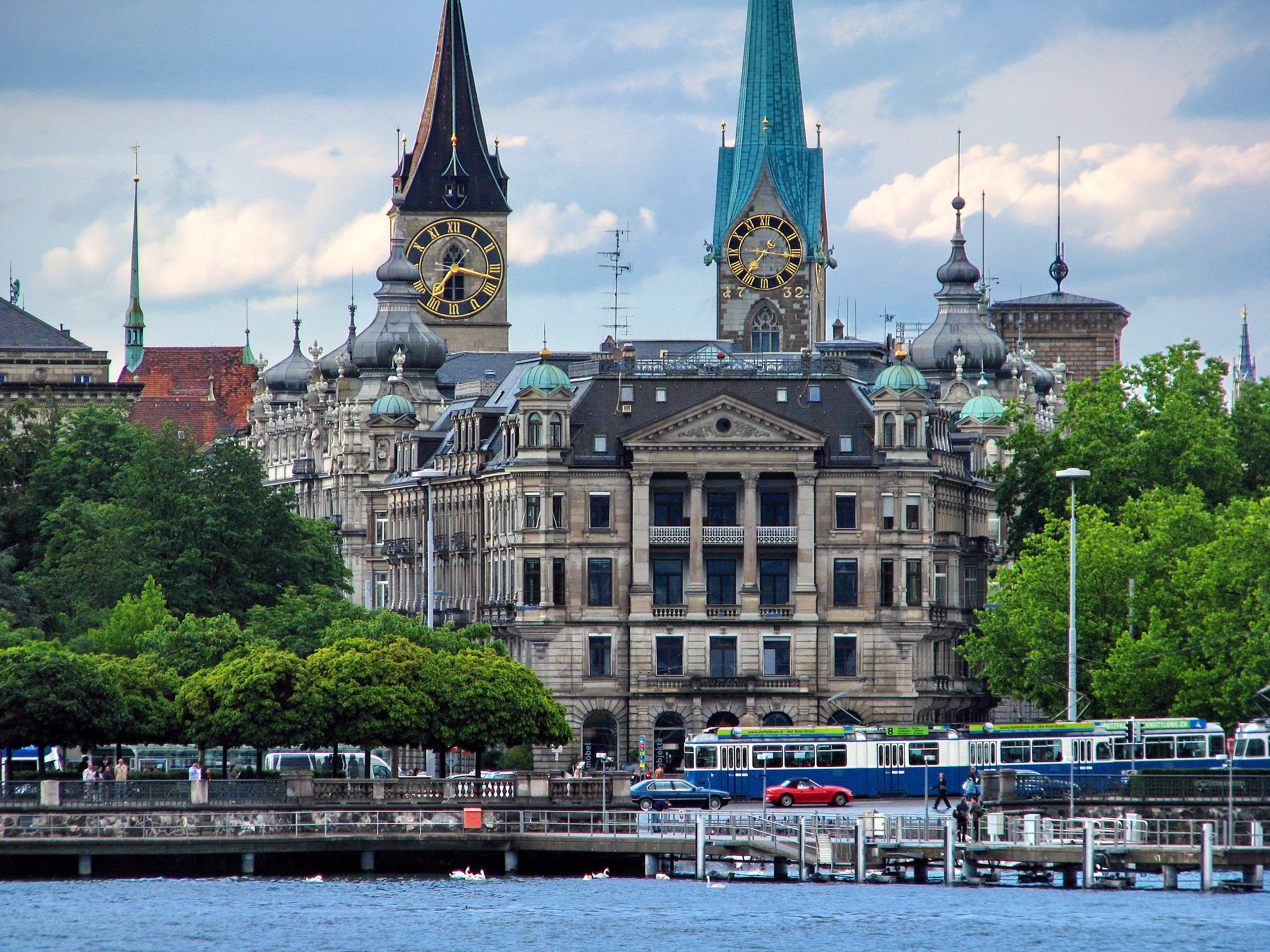
The church towers of St. Peter and Fraumünster (to the right) as seen from Bürkliplatz

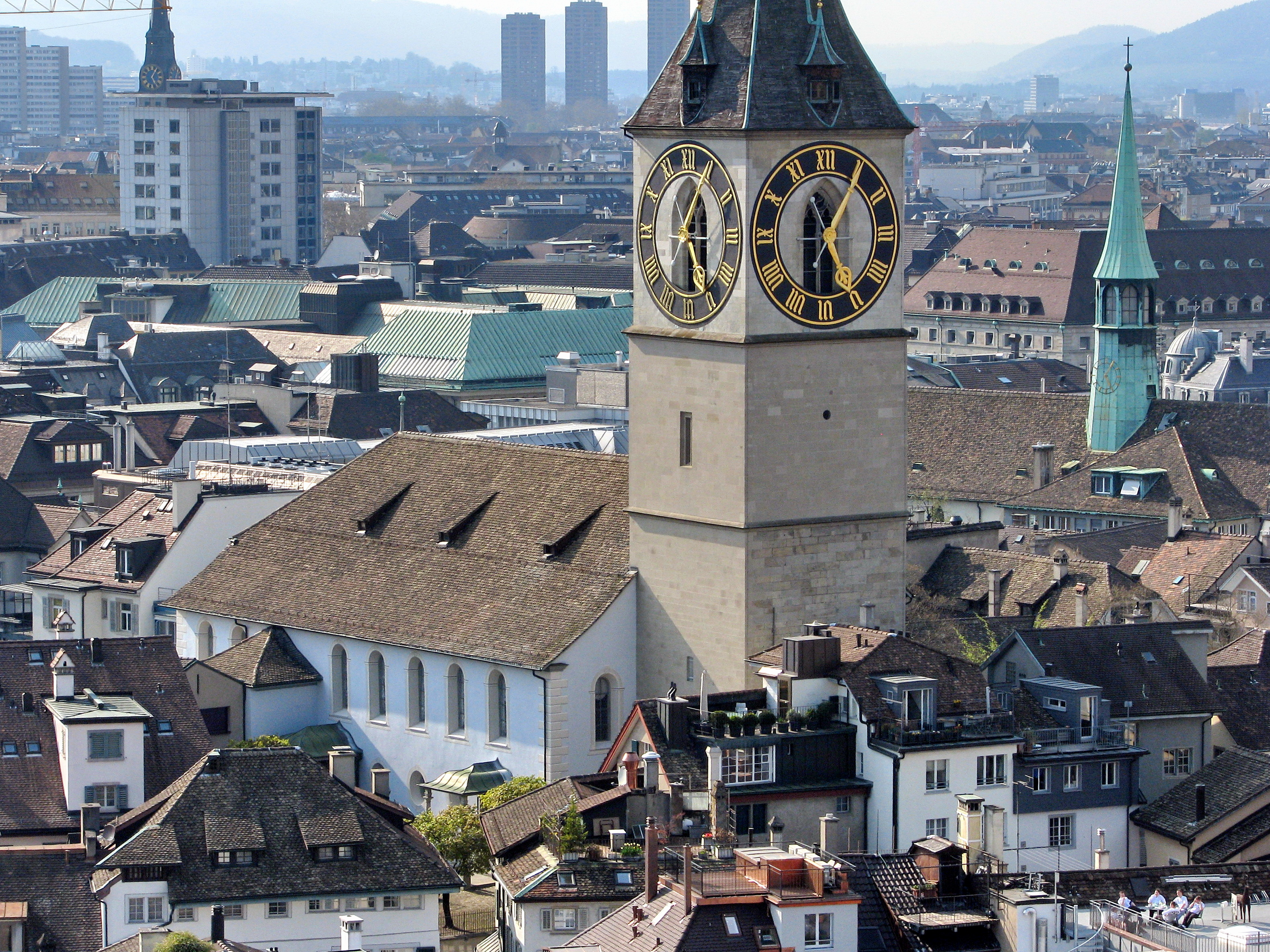
St. Peter as seen from Grossmünster church tower

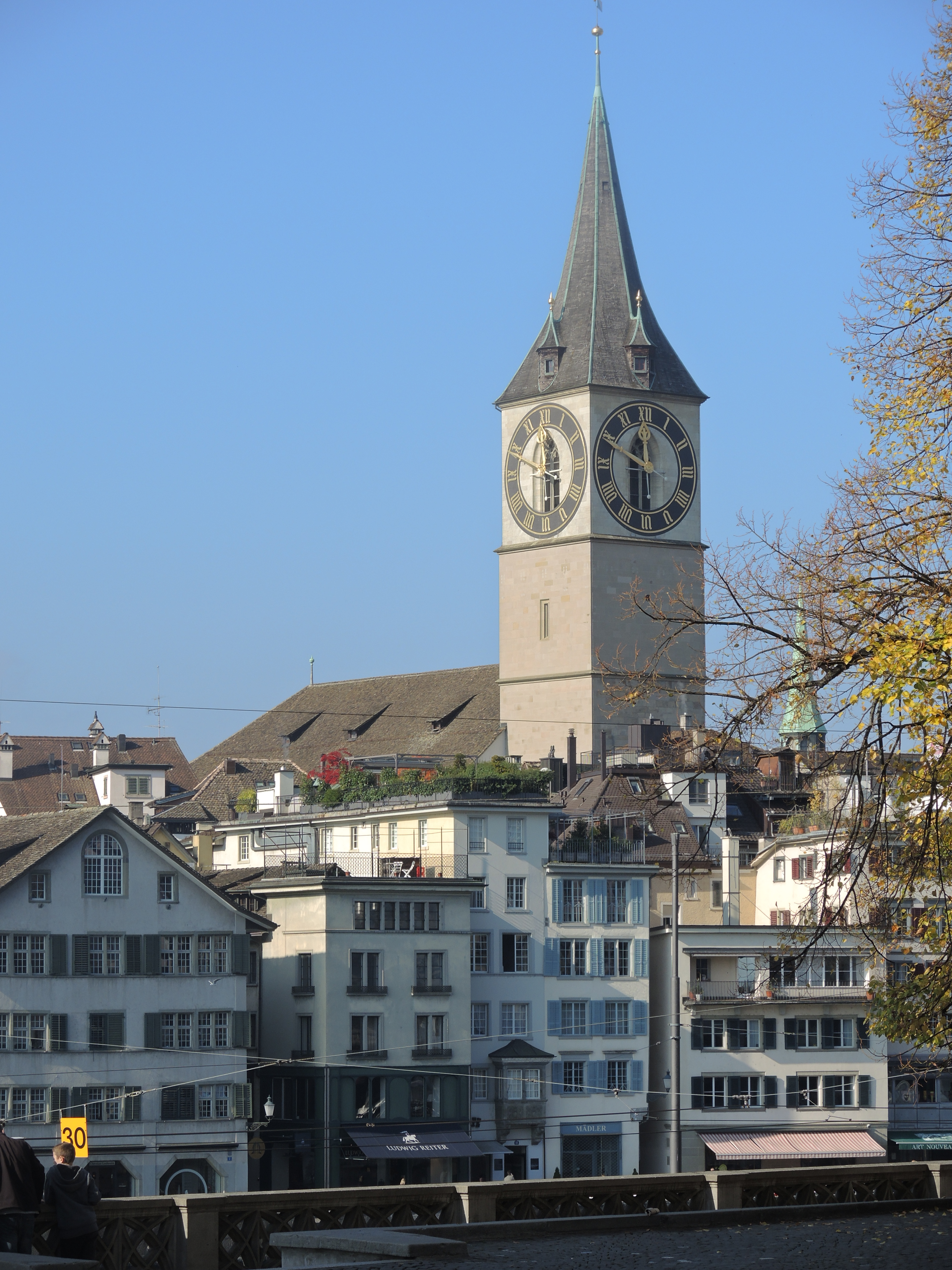
St. Peter as seen from Grossmünster

== Literature ==
- Peter Ziegler: St. Peter in Zurich. Von den Ursprüngen bis zur heutigen Kirchgemeinde. Buchverlag NZZ, Zurich 2006 (in German)
