= Weinplatz (Zurich) =

Public square in Zürich, Switzerland

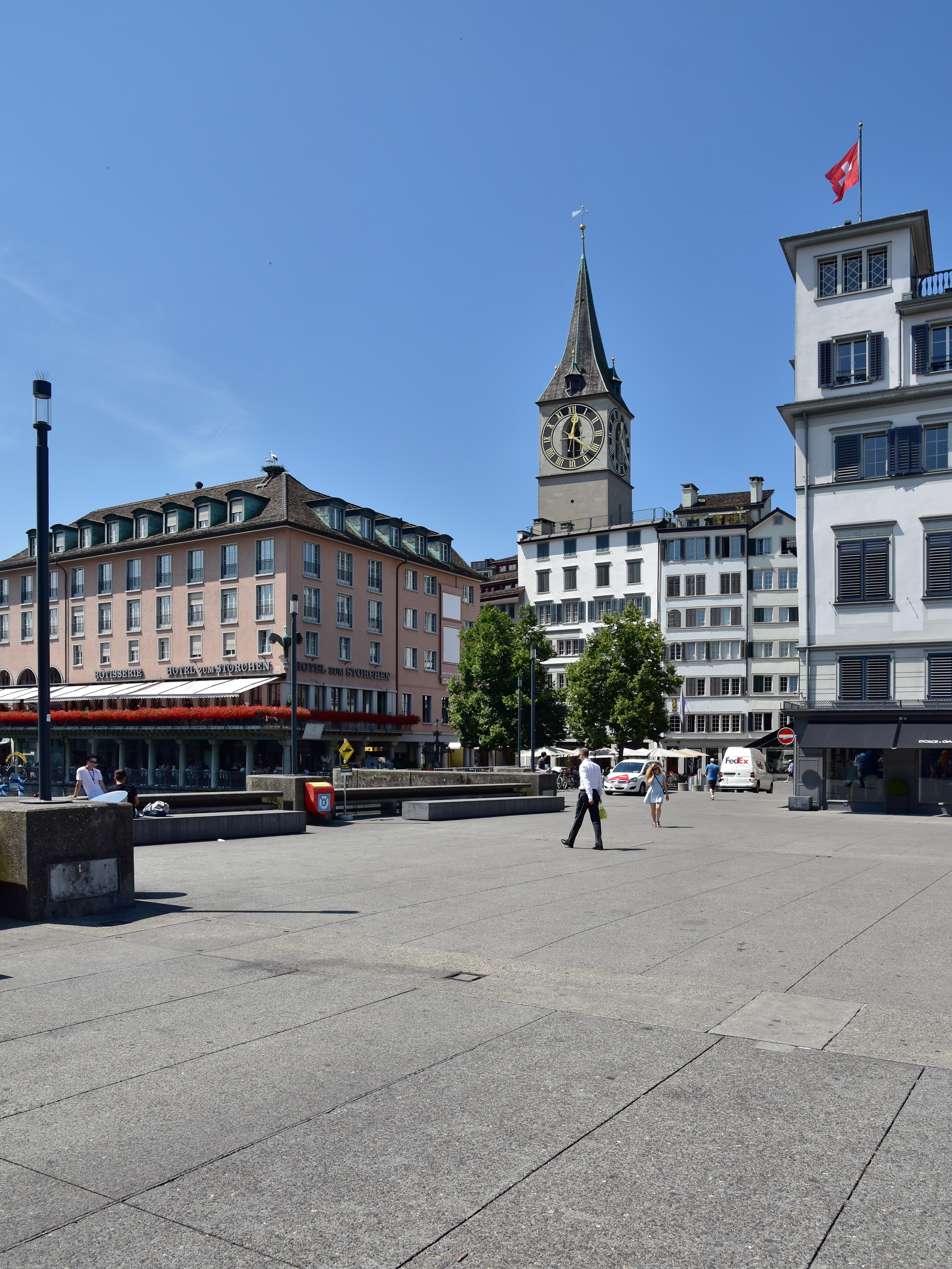
- Weinplatz as seen from Limmatquai, Rathausbrücke in the foreground, Storchen hotel to the left, Schwert tower to the right.
- Interactive map of Weinplatz
- Type: pedestrian
- Owner: City of Zürich
- Addresses: Weinplatz
- Location: Zürich-Lindenhof, Switzerland
- Postal code: 8001
- Coordinates: 47.372°N 8.542°E

Weinplatz (literally: wine square) is a popular public square adjacent to the Gmüesbrugg (also known as the Rathausbrücke, or Town Hall Bridge) and the historical Schipfe quarter of Zurich, Switzerland.

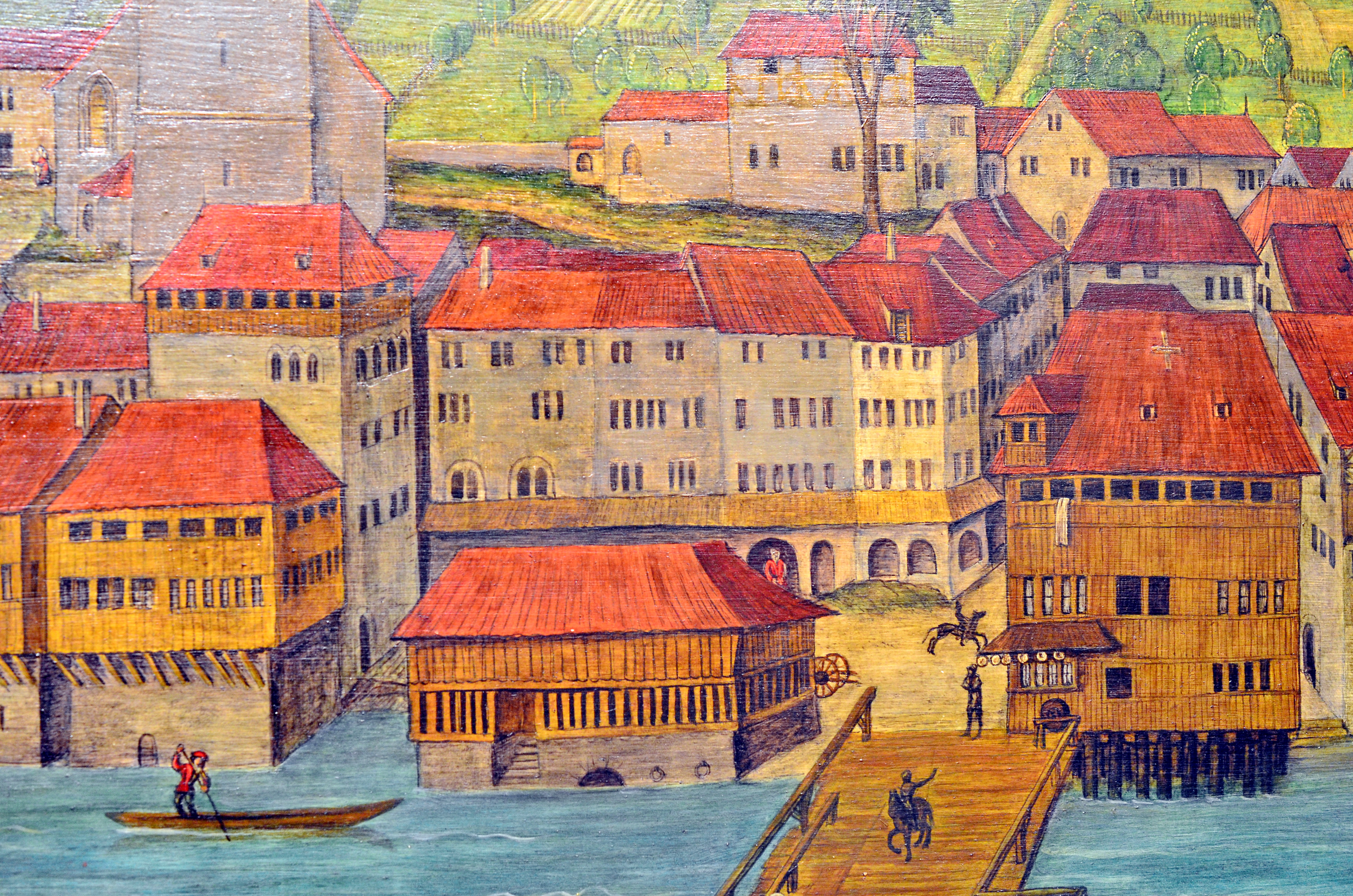
Weinplatz at the wooden medieval bridge between Schipfe and Weinplatz, and the present Limmatquai, Altarbilder by Hans Leu d.Ä., c. 1498

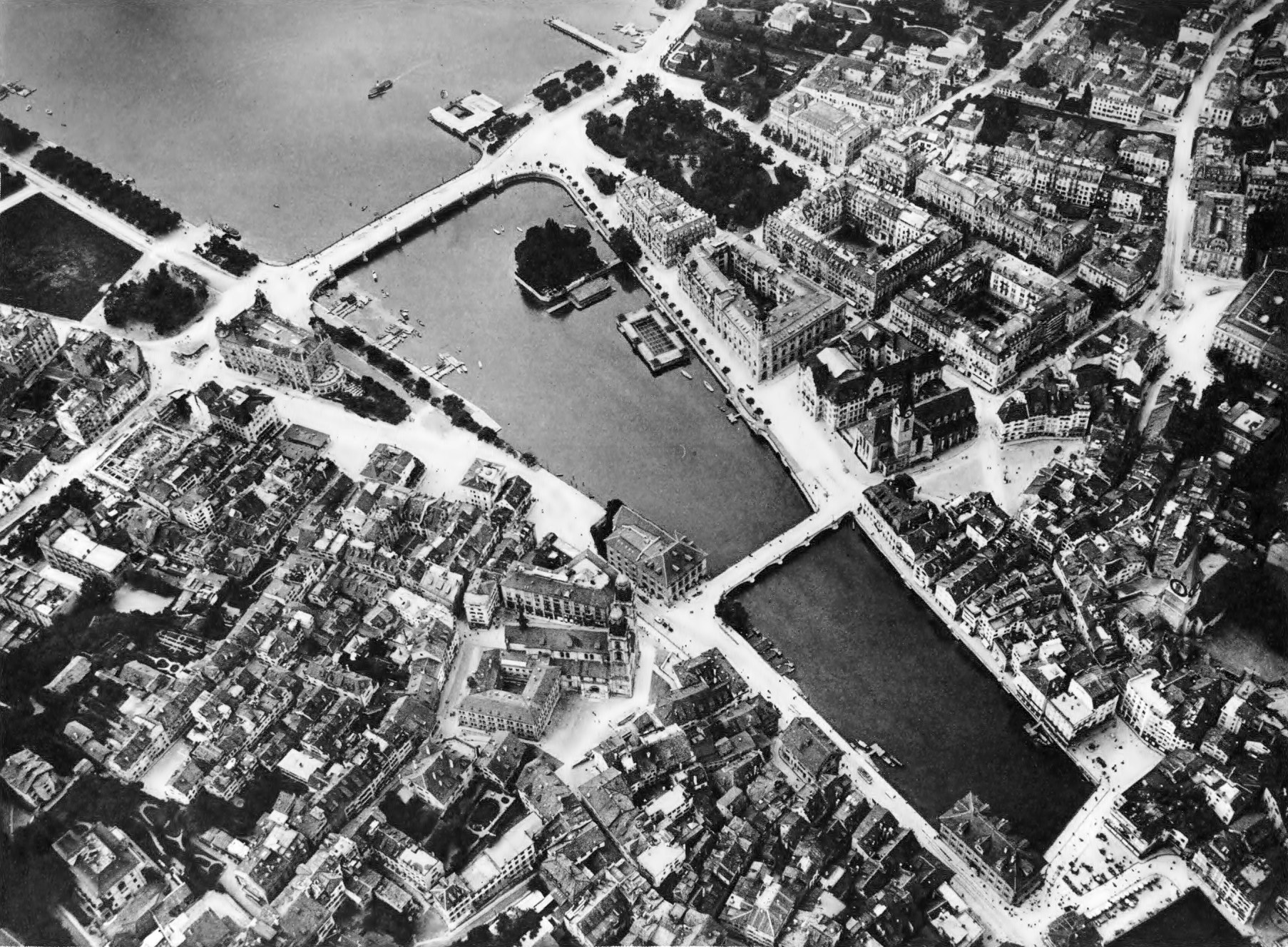
Quaibrücke, Münsterbrücke and Rathausbrücke on an aerial photograph by Eduard Spelterini, c. 1895

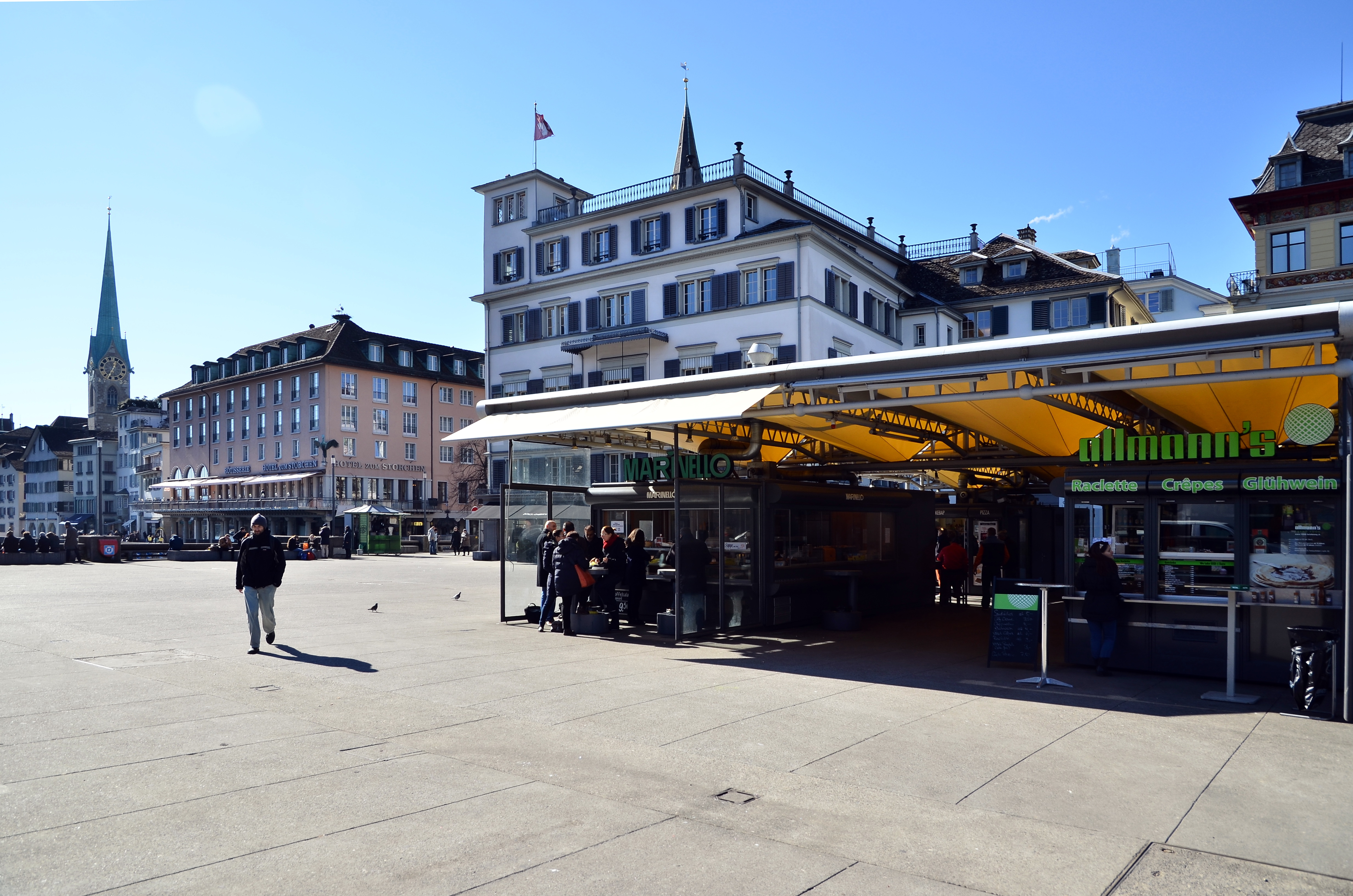
Weinplatz and Rathausbrücke as seen from Limmatquai

== Geography ==
Weinplatz is situated in the historical center of Zurich, on the southeastern foothill of the Lindenhof, westerly of the Rathausbrücke plaza, north of the Münsterhof plaza, and south of the Schipfe quarter on the eastern bank of the Limmat.

== History ==
In 70/75 AD a harbor district rose on the newly acquired lands on the Limmat riverbank at the foot of the former Oppidum Lindenhof at the Schipfe–Weinplatz area, and the settlement area of the Gallo-Roman Turicum was extended on the right bank of the Limmat at the present Limmatquai. Public buildings made of stone and paved roads were built. Suggested by the recent archaeological evidence uncovered during construction at Münsterbrücke, the present Weinplatz may have been the site of the civilian harbour of the Celtic-Roman Turicum. At the site of the present Weinplatz towards St. Peterhofstatt the remains of remarkable 2nd to 4th century AD Thermae were excavated.

Being part of the ancient Kornhausplatz (Rathhausbrücke) plaza, Weinplatz was used as a grain and vegetable store in medieval times, and became in 1630 the public market for local wines, the present Weinplatz square. Despite the relocation of the market to the Münsterhof plaza in 1647, the name is still the same. Some medieval sources mention the Rother Turm building, meaning the "red tower" which was used by the House of Rapperswil as its seat in Zürich in the early 13th century; much later it became a 'literature café' and was demolished. Weinplatz now is a popular tourist destination, nearby the Münsterhof plaza, and it is the location of some small shops and cafés.

== Points of interest ==
=== Thermengasse ===
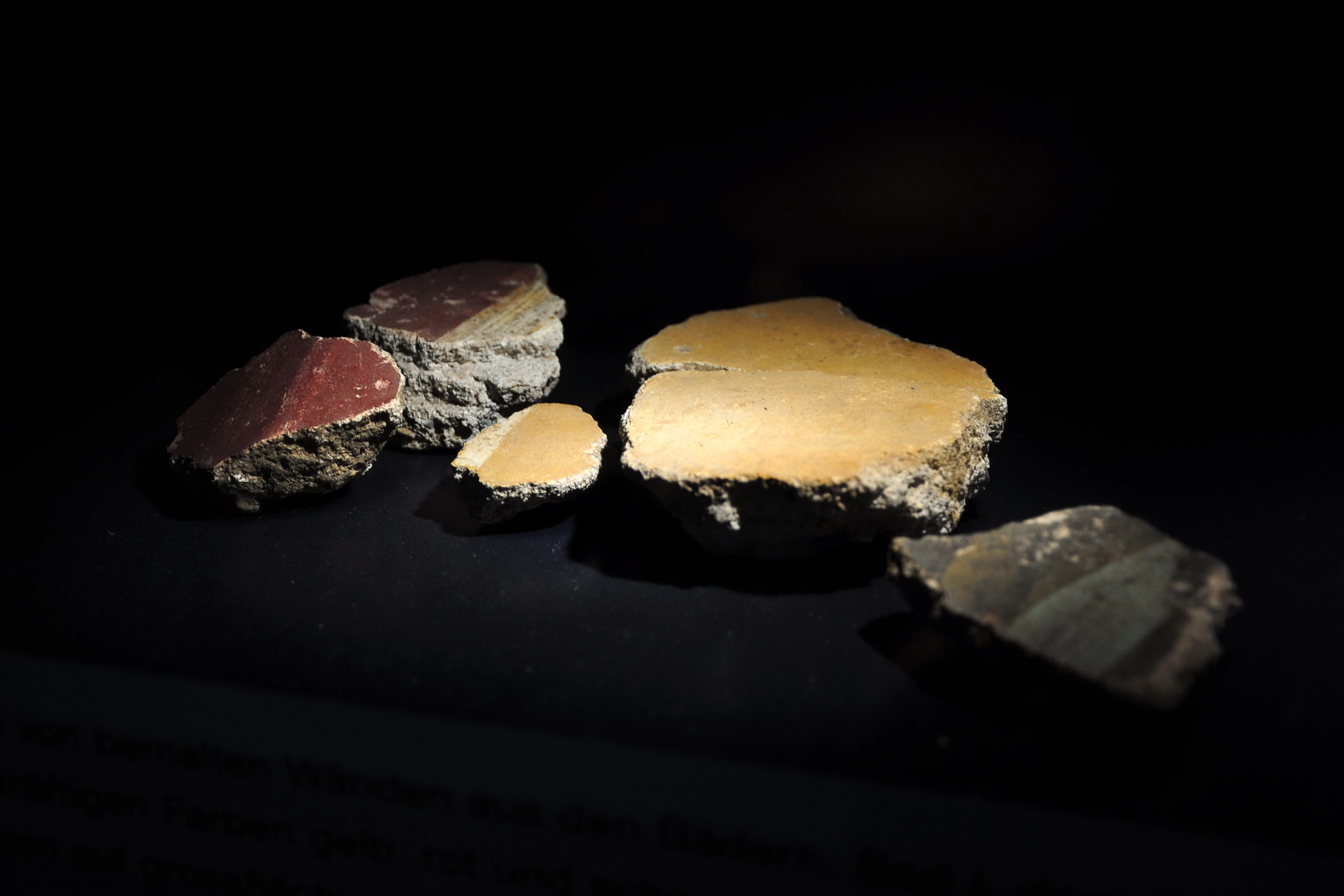
1st-century AD mosaics at Thermengasse

Towards St. Peterhofstatt, the remains of the Roman Thermae were discovered on occasion of archaeological excavations in 1983–84. The site is partially open to the public and illustrated by information boards, as well as replicas of some of the artefacts that were found at the site.

=== Haus zum Schwert ===
First mentioned in 1265, the Zürich knight Jakob Mülner handed over his residential tower zum Schwert (literally: sword tower) to the Fraumünster Abbey, and returned it as a fief. From the daughters of Gotfried II, in 1406 the complex came to Hans Brunner who set up an inn. Today, the former tower is an accommodation building and houses a shop at its ground floor.

=== Hotel Zum Storchen ===
The origin of the name "Zum Storchen" (literally: To the Stork) is unclear, but a local legend tells that the name comes from several of rare black storks that brooded on its roof long ago. In 1357, the building Hus zum Storchen (literally Stork House) was mentioned for the first time in tax records of the city. About a century later, it was designated as a hostel, a tradition that lasted for several hundred years. In 1938, the medieval structure was rebuilt to house the present hotel, bar and restaurant. The building also serves as the guild house of the Zunft zur Schiffleuten, a medieval guild of the fishermen and boatmen, whose name is perhaps a reference to the ancient harbour at the Weinplatz square near the hotel.

== Transportation ==
Located next to the Rathausbrücke, public transport is provided by the Zürich tram lines 2, 4, and 15. At the Storchen stop, Zürichsee-Schifffahrtsgesellschaft provides also public transportation towards Bürkliplatz and Zürichhorn. Individual transportation usually is prohibited. The area is part of the pedestrian zone in the old town of Zürich, hence, vehicle traffic is limited between lower Limmatquai downstream and the Bellevueplatz square upstream.

== Literature ==
- Regine Abegg, Christine Barraud Wiener: Die Kunstdenkmäler des Kantons Zürich. Band II.II: Stadt Zürich. Wiese Verlag, Basel 2003. ISBN 978-3-906131-87-0.
