= Schipfe =

Historical neighborhood in the city of Zurich, Switzerland

Coordinates: 47°22′23″N 8°32′31″E

Schipfe (Swiss Standard German pronunciation: [ˈʃɪpfɛ]) is a residential district in Zurich, Switzerland, located on the eastern slope of the Lindenhof, one of the oldest parts of the Helvetii Oppidum Zurich-Lindenhof, by the river Limmat. Historians and the Weinplatz suggest that the district was part of the former civilian harbour of the Celtic-Roman Turicum.

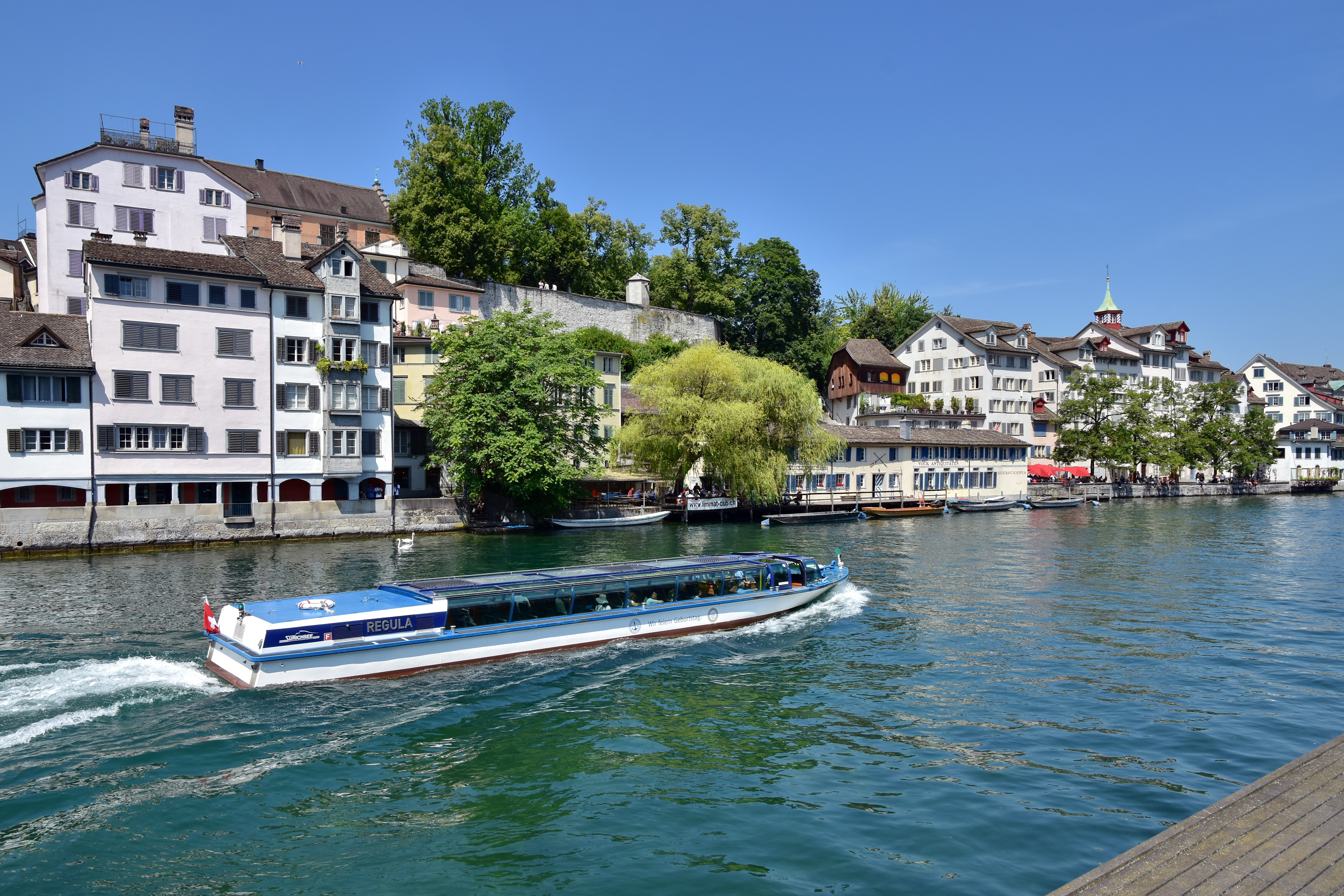
Lindenhof hill fortification and Schipfe as seen from Limmatquai

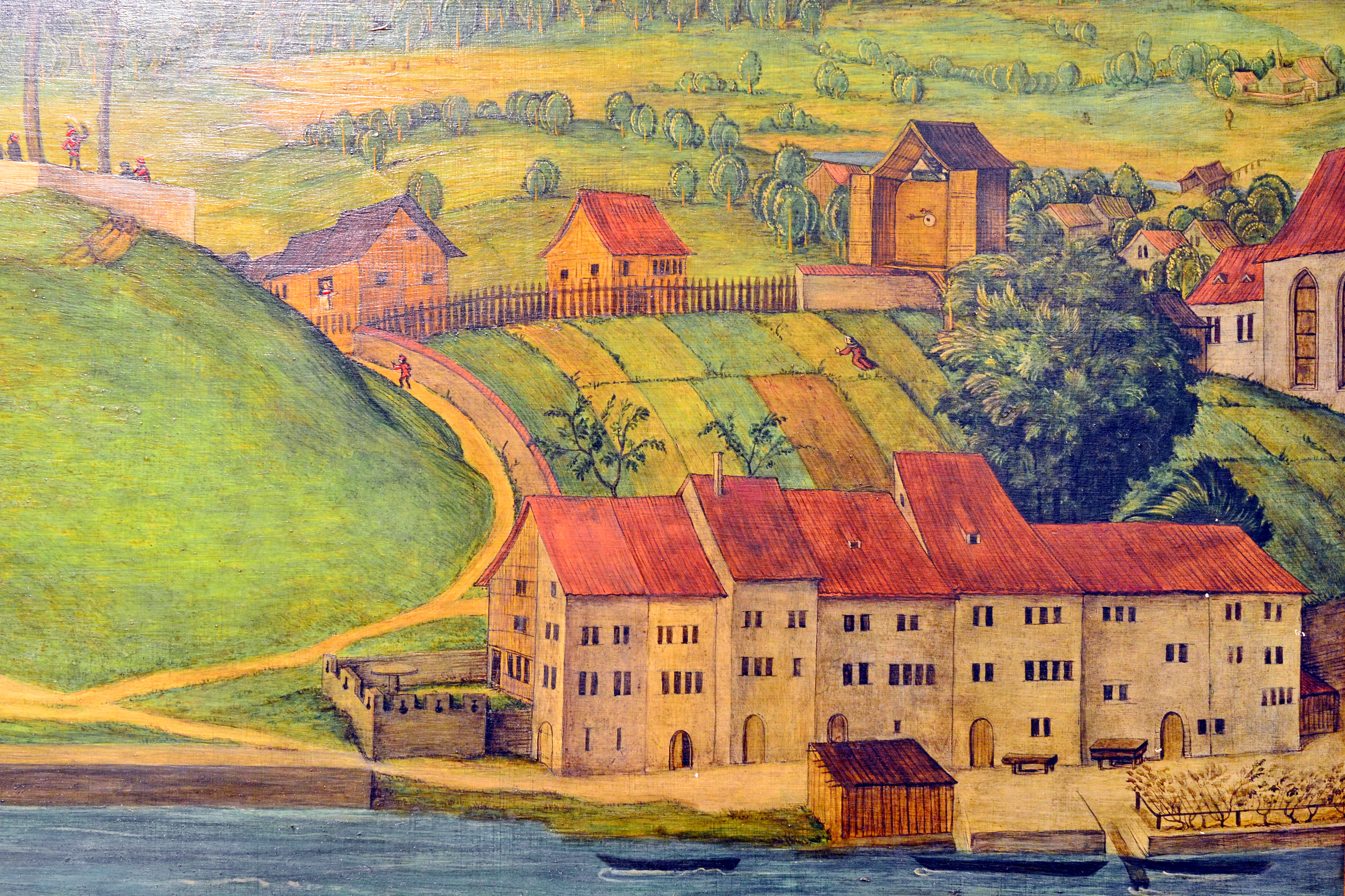
Schipfe and Lindenhof-Sihlbühl, early 16th century, Hans Leu the Elder

== Location ==
Schipfe belongs to the historic area on the left hand shore of the Limmat, located on the west side of the Lindenhof-Sihlbühl hill downstream from the ancient bridges Münsterbrücke and Rathausbrücke, Zurich between the present Limmatquai and the prehistoric Lindenhof hill.

== History ==
The Lindenhof was the site of the Helvetii Oppidum and the first century BC Roman settlement (15 BC), with traces of a hypocaustum excavated between Weinplatz and Münsterhof. It was then the historical core of modern Zurich. This is the oldest area of the city, with settlements dating to the pre-Roman La Tène culture, and fortified as oppidum with a surrounding Vicus Turicum in the final decades of the 1st century BC.

In medieval times, the Oetenbach nunnery was located in the district, but was abolished in 1525 and finally demolished in 1901/02. The Uraniastrasse road and the Urania Sternwarte were later built, and the so-called Waisenhaus Zürich asylum became the headquarters of the Zurich City Police. Today the Schipfe is well known for its romantic houses at the Limmat and several almost hidden shops opposite the Limmatquai.

First mentioned in 1292 as "Schüpfi" (German for where the boats land), the quarter has a population of 431 distributed on an area less of 0.5 km^{2}.
