= Rathausbrücke, Zurich =

Rathausbrücke
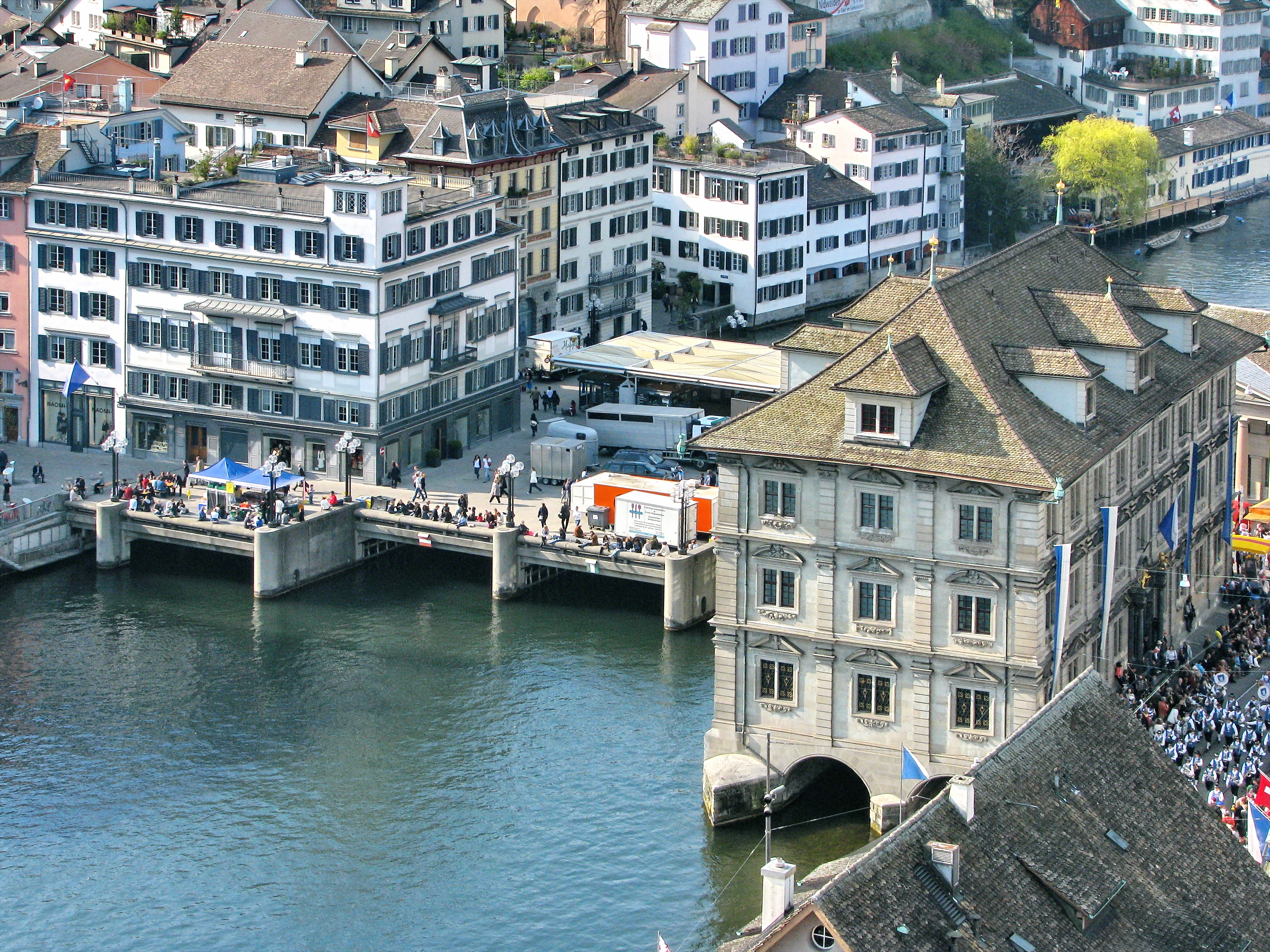
- Rathausbrücke and Weinplatz to the left, and Rathaus Zürich in the foreground, as well as Schipfe, as seen from Grossmünster's Karlsturm
- Coordinates: 47°22′18.5″N 8°32′32.3″E
- Carries: pedestrians
- Crosses: Limmat
- Locale: Lindenhof–Schipfe–Weinplatz–Limmatquai in Zurich, Switzerland
- Official name: Rathausbrücke
- ID number: 1572

Characteristics
- Material: Concrete
- No. of spans: 4

History
- Construction start: 1892 and 1972
- Opened: 1893 and 1973

Statistics
- Daily traffic: pedestrian

Location
- Interactive map of Rathausbrücke

Rathausbrücke (lit. 'town hall bridge'), colloquially named Gmüesbrugg (Swiss German for "vegetable bridge"), is a pedestrian bridge which crosses the river Limmat in Zurich, Switzerland. It is a popular public square connecting Limmatquai, the Weinplatz and the historical Schipfe quarter.

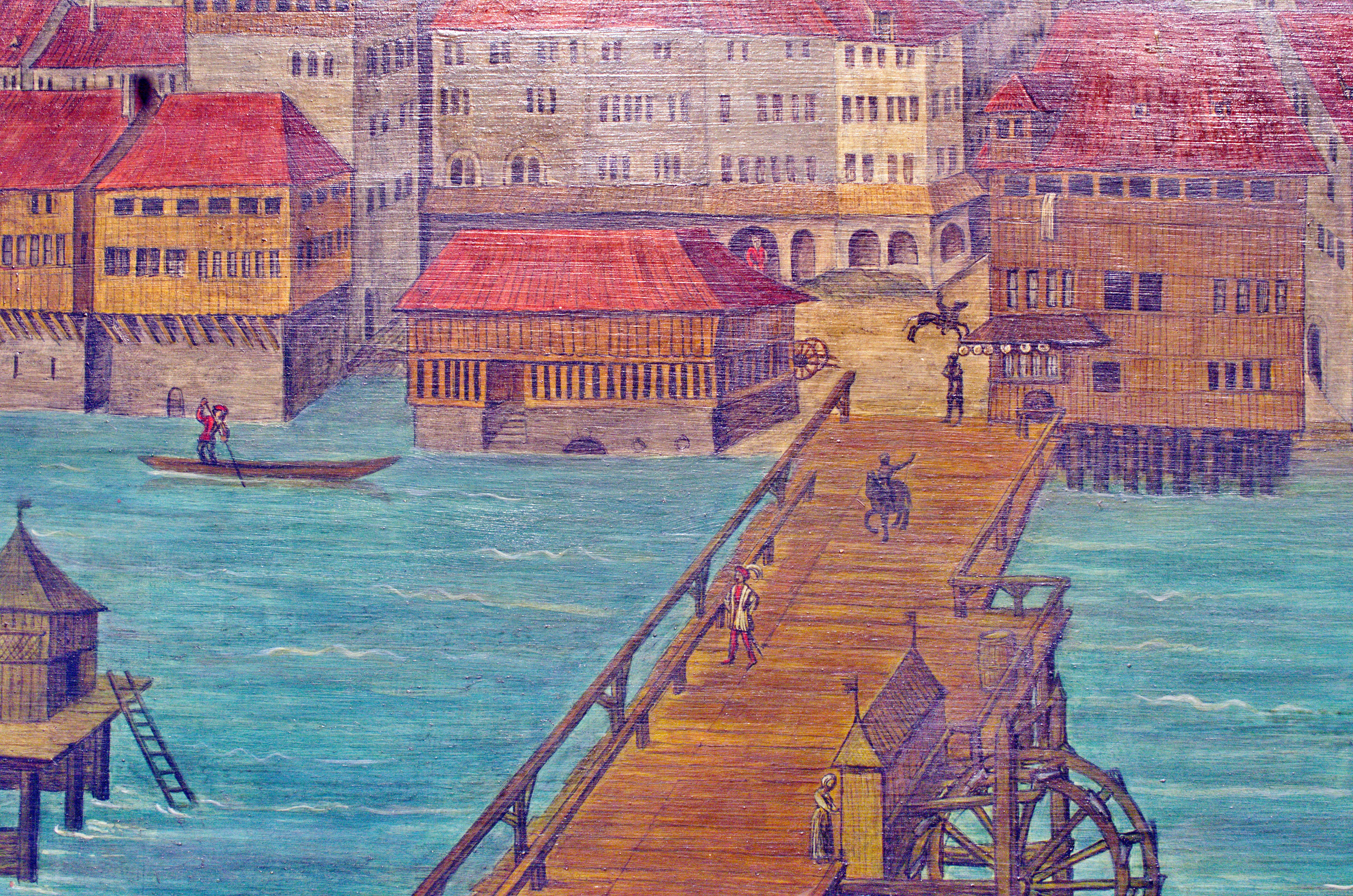
Wooden medieval bridge between Schipfe and Weinplatz and the present Limmatquai, Altarbilder by Hans Leu d.Ä., c. 1498

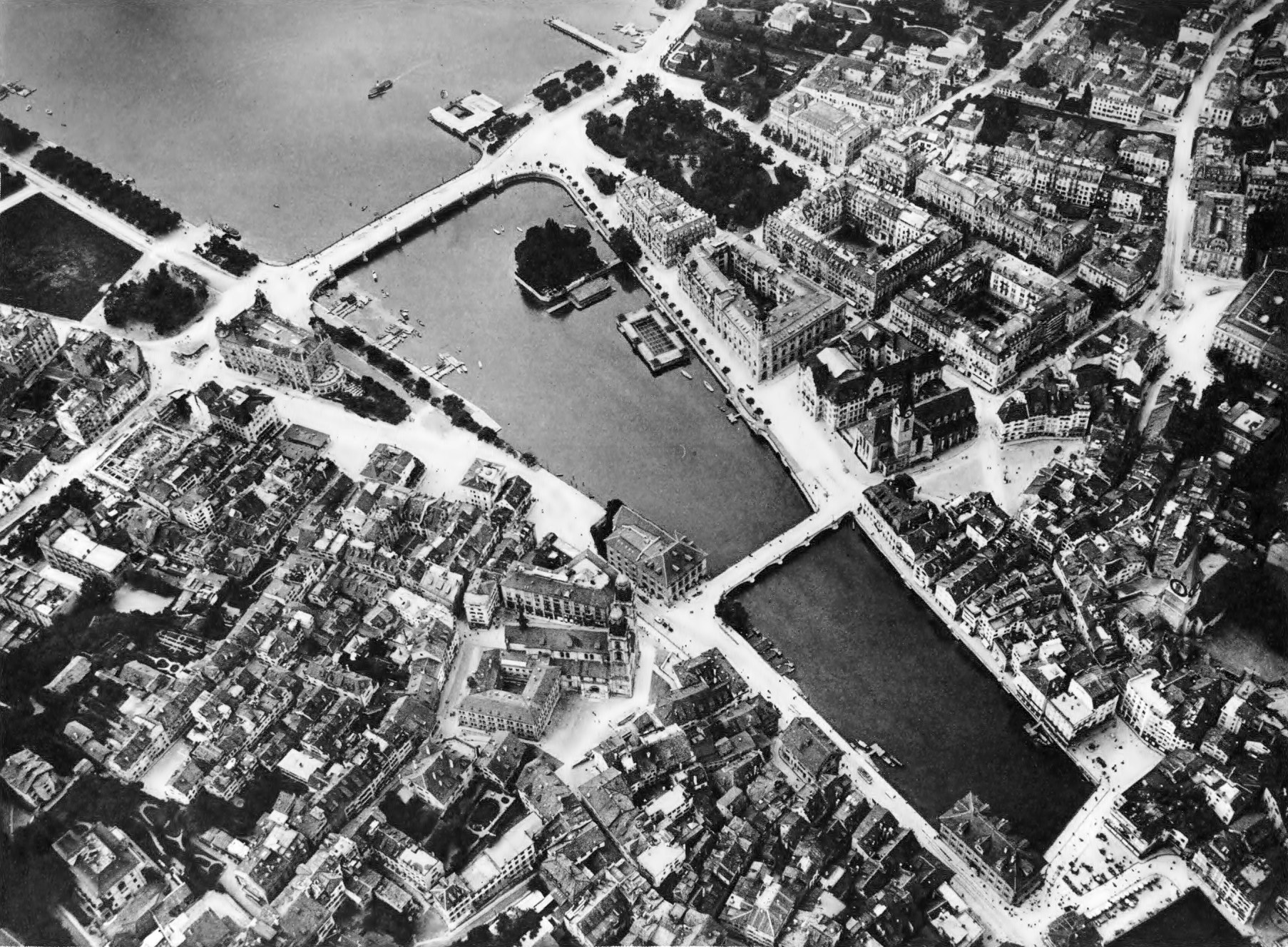
Quaibrücke, Münsterbrücke and Rathausbrücke on an aerial photograph by Eduard Spelterini, c. 1895

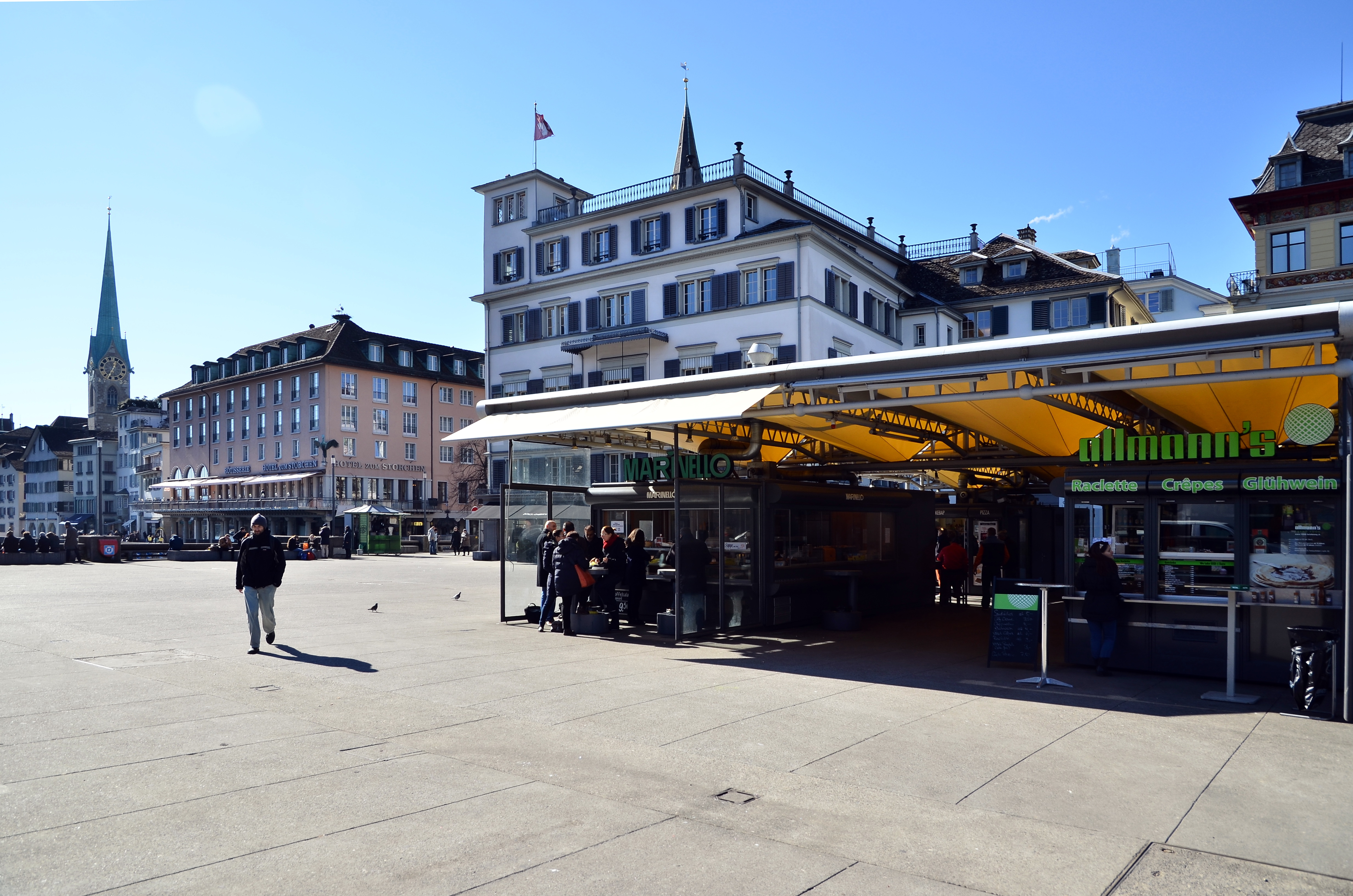
Weinplatz and Rathausbrücke as seen from Limmatquai

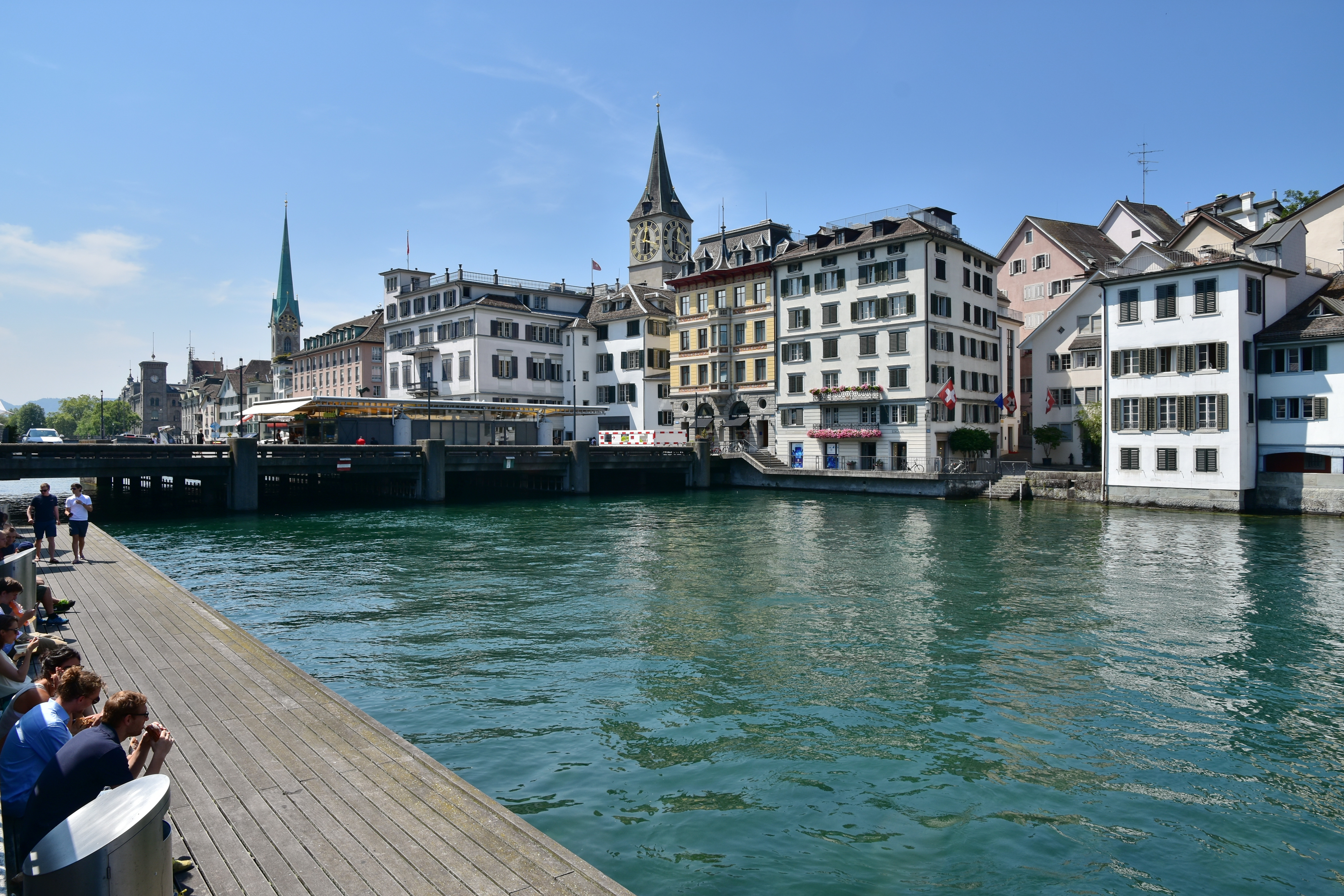
Rathaus Bridge and Schipfe as seen from Limmatquai upstream the Limmat

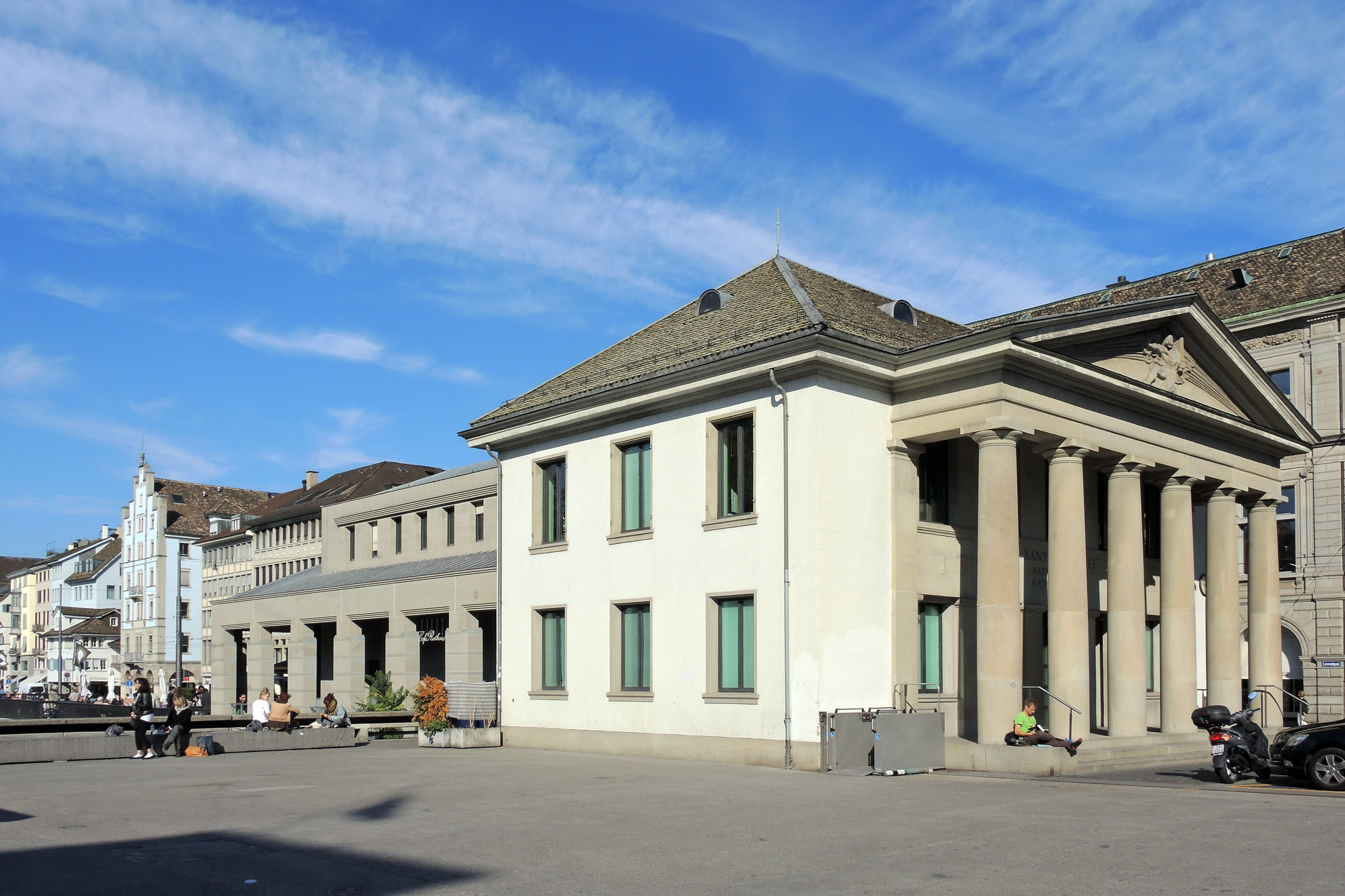
Kantonspolizei Zürich (police station) and adjacent café. The portico and white building formerly fronted the butchers' market (Fleischhalle) which stood on the bridge for almost a century

== Geography ==
Rathausbrücke is situated in the historical center of Zurich, on the southeastern foothill of the Lindenhof, near the Lindenhof–Weinplatz–Münsterhof area on the eastern bank of the Limmat. Today, the bridge is used as a public square and pedestrian bridge connecting the Lindenhof Schipfe quarter and the Rathaus quarter.

== Transportation ==
Although Rathausbrücke is a historically important bridge in Zurich, it is not a nodal point of the present tram railways. Neither the road traffic between General-Guisan-Quai and Limmatquai, nor the traffic from Rämistrasse and Utoquai, use the Rathausbrücke as a primary thoroughfare. The Zurich tram lines 2, 4, and 15, as well as the Zürichsee-Schifffahrtsgesellschaft provide public transportation. Individual transportation usually is limited to commercial traffic. The area is a pedestrian zone, hence, vehicle traffic is limited between lower Limmatquai and the Bellevueplatz square upstream.

== Architecture ==
The first extensions of the medieval wooden bridge were carried out in 1375 and 1420–21. The medieval bridge was wider than necessary, and housed the mills of the Oetenbach Nunnery, as shown by the altarpiece of the Grossmünster Zwölfbotenkapelle by Hans Leu. Only the breakwaters at the inflow side were built of stone, which can be seen on the Murerplan. All other sections of the bridge consisted mostly of wood. As Schipfe expanded, it became necessary to expand the bridge to accommodate the new traffic. From 1602 to 1605, the bridge was rebuilt with the present dimensions. The bridge was bound on the east by the former Hotel Zum Schwert (now a commercial building) and in the west with a wooden platform made of oak planks. The bridge section between the town hall and the Hauptwache was rebuilt from stone. From 1881 to 1893, the remaining wooden bridge was replaced by a cast-iron construction. The old stalls and shops were slowly replaced by modern commercial buildings, including a café and sanitary installations. In 1972, it once again became necessary to rebuild the bridge. The new design, made of reinforced concrete, was designed by the architect Manuel Pauli and was completed in 1973.

== History ==
The bridge is commonly known as Gmüesbrugg, Swiss German for "vegetable bridge." It received its name after the medieval market on the bridge. However, the first bridge at that location may have been built in the Roman era. In medieval times, it was named Untere Brücke, or "lower bridge," as opposed to the Münsterbrücke Limmat crossing called the "upper bridge." It was later renamed after the town hall which was built on its eastern side between 1692 and 1698.

A large butchers' market (Fleischhalle) stood in the northeastern corner of Gmüesbrugg between 1866 and 1962. It replaced a slaughterhouse.

== Points of interest ==
Today, the plaza serves as a public square, and is a pedestrian zone. Rathausbrücke also serves as the setting for numerous local festivals and public events. At the site of the former Rother Turm ("red tower"), the Hotel zum Storchen was built. Opposite of the building, the former seat of the medieval Mülner family is located, the Haus zum Schwert, named after the sword-holder on the banner of the Zurich.

=== Weinplatz ===
The square in front of the lower bridge, thereafter the old Kornhausplatz was used as a grain and vegetable store in medieval times, and became in 1630 the public market for local wines, the present Weinplatz square. Despite the relocation of the market to the Münsterhof plaza in 1647, the name is still the same. Some medieval sources mention the Rother Turm building, which was used by the House of Rapperswil as its seat in Zurich in the early 13th century; much later it became a 'literature café' and was demolished. Not yet archaeological proven but suggested by the historians, Weinplatz was also the former civilian harbour of the Celtic-Roman settlement Turicum, and so the term Weinplatz may have an ancient meaning.

== Reconstruction ==
In July 2015, the city's authorities announced plans to either rebuild or replace the bridge, as the concrete construction of does not meet the modern flood code.

In November 2024, the reconstruction plans, with an estimated cost of 58 million Swiss francs, were accepted on a city-wide referendum.

== See also ==
- List of bridges in Switzerland
