= Dölf Wild =

Swiss historian, archaeologist and science writer

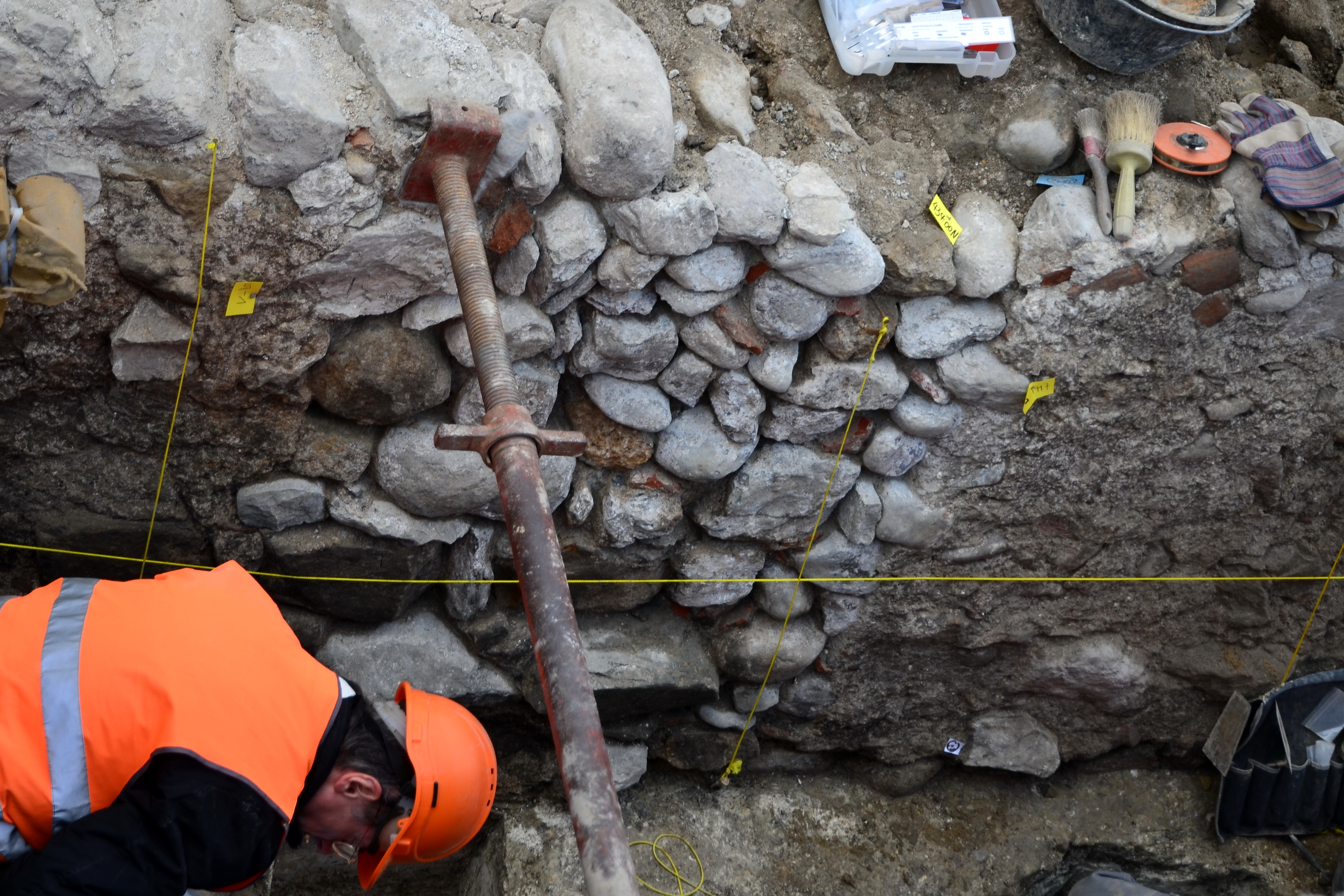
- Wild at excavations in Zürich, near Fraumünster
- Born: 1954 (age 71–72); Neuhausen am Rheinfall
- Education: University of Zürich
- Scientific career
- Fields: History, Archaeology, European Medieval history
- Doctoral advisor: Prof. H. R. Sennhauser

Dölf Wild (born 1954) is a Swiss historian, archaeologist and science writer, and works as the chief archaeologist of the city of Zürich. He is best known for his research into the building industry of medieval Zürich and for his contribution to the conservation of Switzerland's architectural heritage.

== Life and work ==
Dölf Wild grew up in Neuhausen am Rheinfall, and undertook an apprenticeship as a draftsman at the company that is now SIG Sauer in Neuhausen. Later, he earned a baccalaureate at the cantonal school for adults KME in Zürich. He studied history, anthropology and art history at the University of Zurich, and in 1999 completed a thesis on Das Predigerkloster in Zürich. Ein Beitrag zur Architektur der Bettelorden im 13. Jahrhundert

Since 2001, Dölf Wild has been the chief archaeologist (German: Leiter Stadtarchäologie Zürich) of the city of Zürich. Among his other duties in that role, he supervised the 2014/15 excavations at the Münsterhof plaza.

== Publications (selection) ==
- Zürichs Münsterhof – ein städtischer Platz des 13. Jahrhunderts? Überlegungen zum Thema »Stadtgestalt und Öffentlichkeit« im mittelalterlichen Zürich. Published by the city of Zürich, Zürich 2011.
- Urs Jäggin, Felix Wyss et al.: Die Zürcher Predigerkirche – Wichtige Etappen der Baugeschichte. Auf dem Murerplan beschönigt? Untersuchungen an der Westfassade der Predigerkirche. Amt für Städtebau der Stadt Zürich, Zürich 2006.
- Das Predigerkloster in Zürich. Ein Beitrag zur Architektur der Bettelorden im 13. Jahrhundert. Monographien der Kantonsarchäologie Zürich 32, Hochbaudepartement der Stadt Zürich, Amt für Städtebau, Archäologie, Zürich 1999, ISBN 978-3-905647-89-1.
