= Turicum =

Former Gallo-Roman settlement in Switzerland

- Turegum, Turico
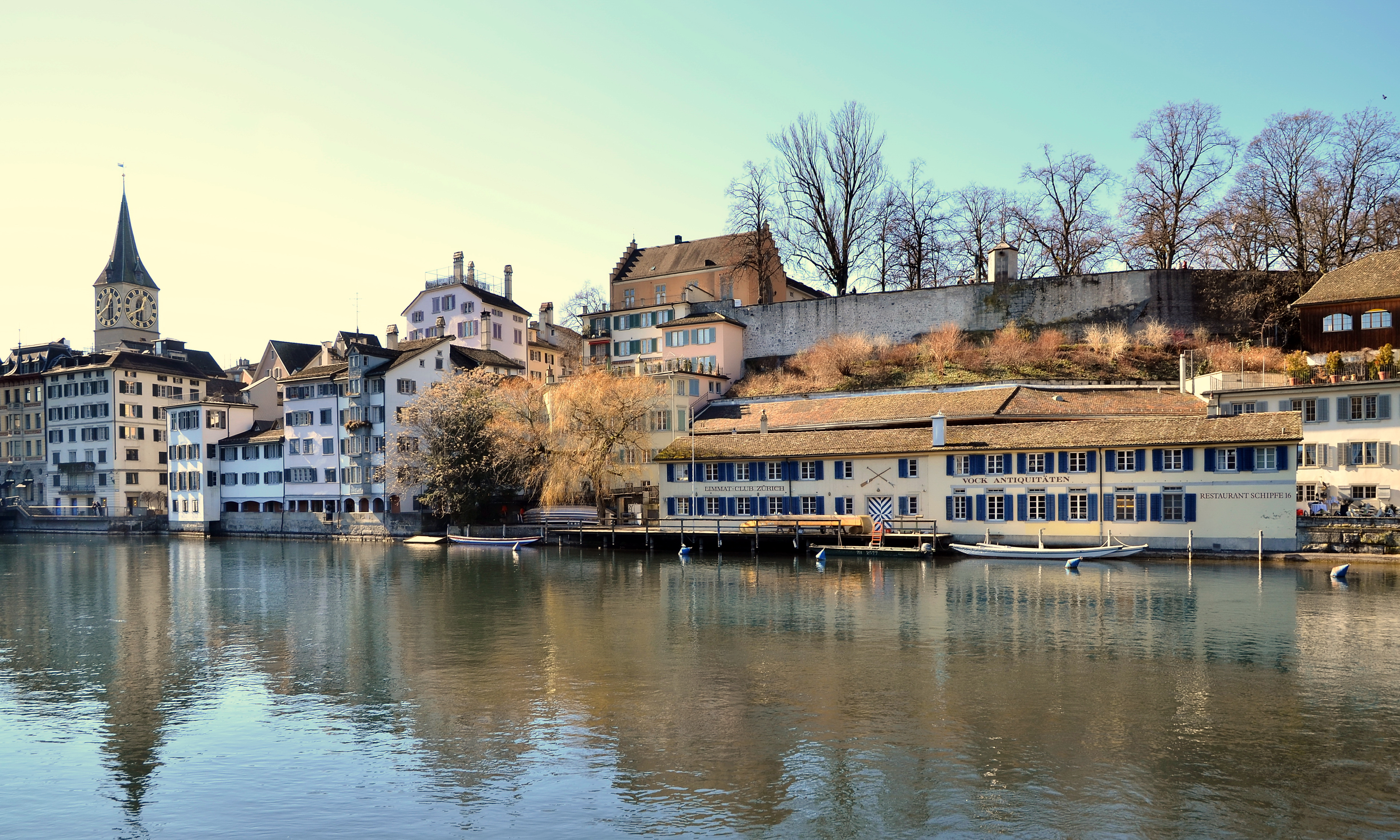
- Lindenhof hill, Schipfe and the Roman wall of the later Pfalz fortifications, as seen from Limmatquai, Weinplatz to the left

- Location within Switzerland
- 47°22′22″N 8°32′26″E
- Type: Vicus
- Periods: Roman Republic to Roman Empire
- Cultures: Helvetii and Gallo-Roman
- Location: Lindenhof–Sihlbühl–Münsterhof-Weinplatz-Limmatquai
- Region: former Germania Superior, present city of Zurich, Canton of Zurich, Switzerland
- Part of: Lindenhof hill respectively Oppidum Zürich-Lindenhof

History
- Built: Probably around 15 BC
- Abandoned: Around 401 AD by the Roman army, settlement continued by Gallo-Roman inhabitants

Site notes
- Material: stone and wood
- Length: about 500 metres (1,640 ft) Sihlbühl–Bürkliplatz, Grosser Hafner island excluded
- Width: about 200 metres (656 ft) Augustinergasse–Limmatquai
- Excavation dates: 1906, 1937, 1989, 1997, 1998-2001, 2004, 2007, 2008 and 2014 at Lindenhof hill, Münsterhof, Weinplatz (Thermengasse), Rennweg, Augustinergasse, St. Peterhofstatt, Münzplatz, Schipfe (Limmat) and Grosser Hafner
- Archaeologists: Margrit Balmer, Dölf Wild
- Condition: aeaorchological access
- Owner: City of Zurich
- Management: City of Zurich
- Public access: Thermengasse and so-called Lindenhofkeller showing the Celtii, Gallo-Roman and Carolinum walls.

Turicum was a Gallo-Roman settlement at the lower end of Lake Zurich, and precursor of the city of Zurich. It was situated within the Roman province of Germania Superior and near the border to the province of Raetia; there was a tax-collecting point for goods traffic on the waterway Walensee–Obersee-Lake Zurich–Limmat–Aare–Rhine.

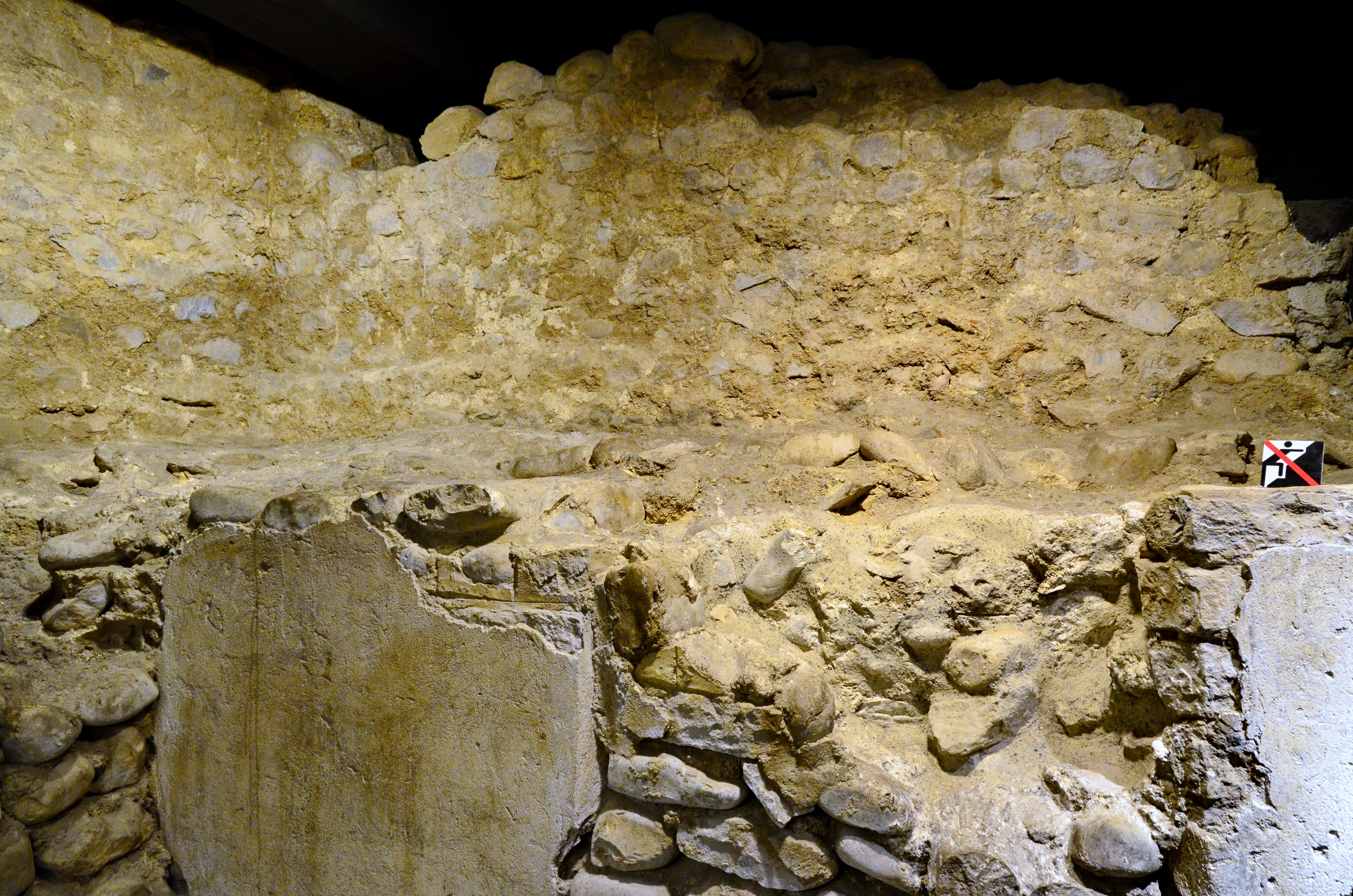
Roman remains of a building at Lindenhofkeller

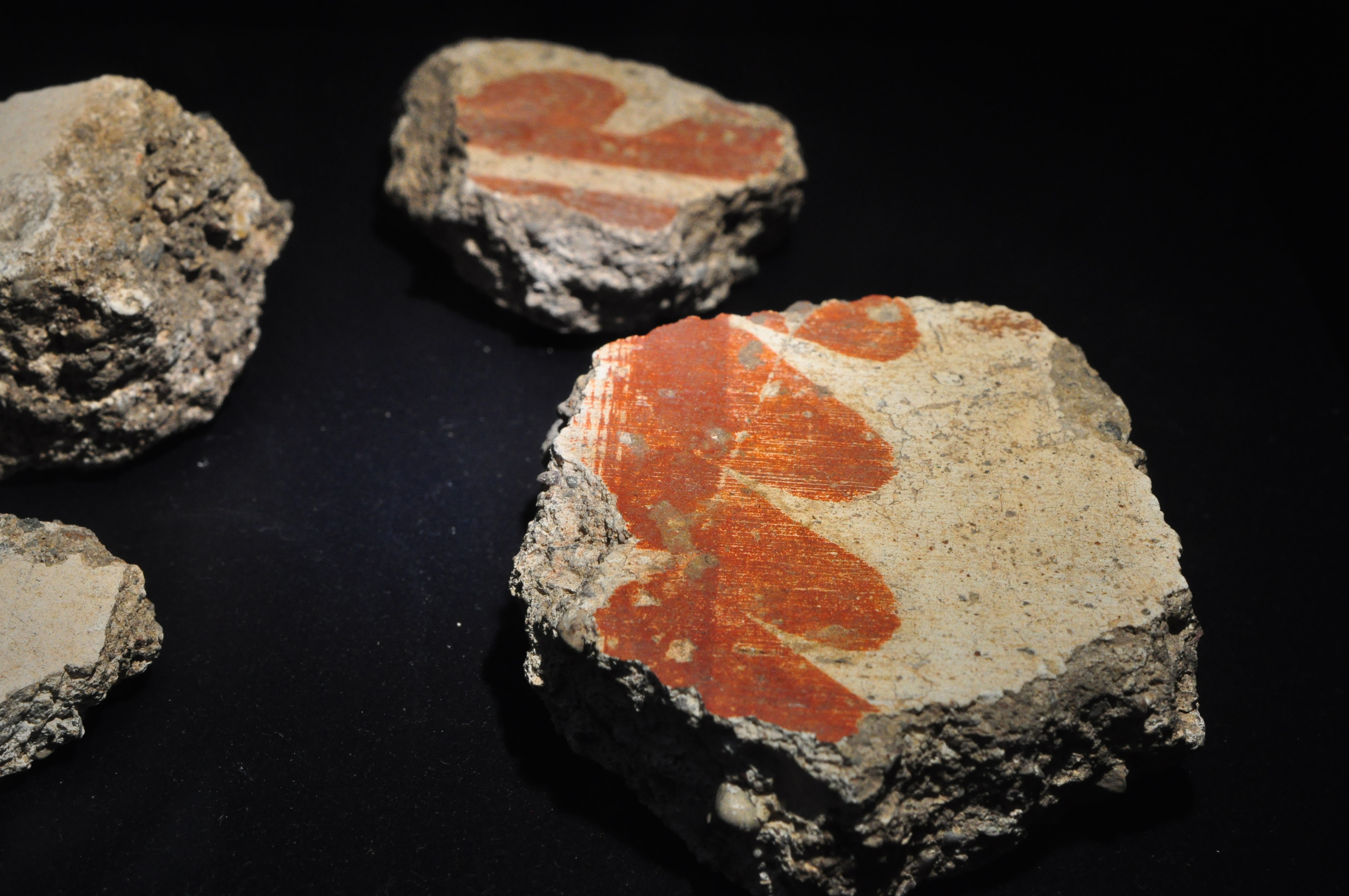
2nd/3rd century AD remains of pluster, Weinplatz (Thermengasse)

== Prehistory and Celtic Oppidum Lindenhof ==
Neolithic pile dwellings were located in the then swamp area between Limmat and Lake Zurich around the present Sechseläutenplatz plaza. These were built on piles to protect the inhabitants against occasional flooding by the rivers Sihl, Linth and Jona. Three settlements were located in Enge, a locality of the municipality of Zurich: Zürich–Enge Alpenquai and Kleiner Hafner on then islands or peninsulas on the effluence of the Limmat, and Grosser Hafner, as well as the settlement Kleiner Hafner near the present Sechseläutenplatz plaza on the effluence of the Limmat on Lake Zurich lake shore, all within an area of about 0.2 square kilometres (49.42 acres) some 500 metres (1,640 ft) away of the core of the Celtic Oppidum respectively the Roman era Vicus.

Probably in the first 1st century BC or even much earlier, the Celts settled on and around the Lindenhof hill. For the 1st century BC La Tène culture, archaeologists excavated individual and aerial finds of the Celtic Oppidum whose remains were discovered in archaeological campaigns in the years 1989, 1997, 2004 and 2007, and also the 1900s and 1930s finds which mistakenly were identified as Roman objects. Extraordinary are the single finds of 1890 at the Prehistoric pile dwelling settlement Alpenquai – the so-called Potin lumps whose largest weights 59.2 kilograms (131 lb) consist of about 18,000 of used Celtic coins which date to around 100 BC. Initially prejudged just as melt coins, the present scientific research assumes that the melting down of the lump was not completed, therefore the aim was to form cultic offerings. The site of the find was at that time around 50 metres (164 ft) from the present Bürkliplatz plaza in the Lake Zurich. Grosser Hafner was also an island sanctuary of the Helvetii in connection with the settlement at the preceding Oppidi Uetliberg and Lindenhof.

== Geography and area of the Roman settlement ==
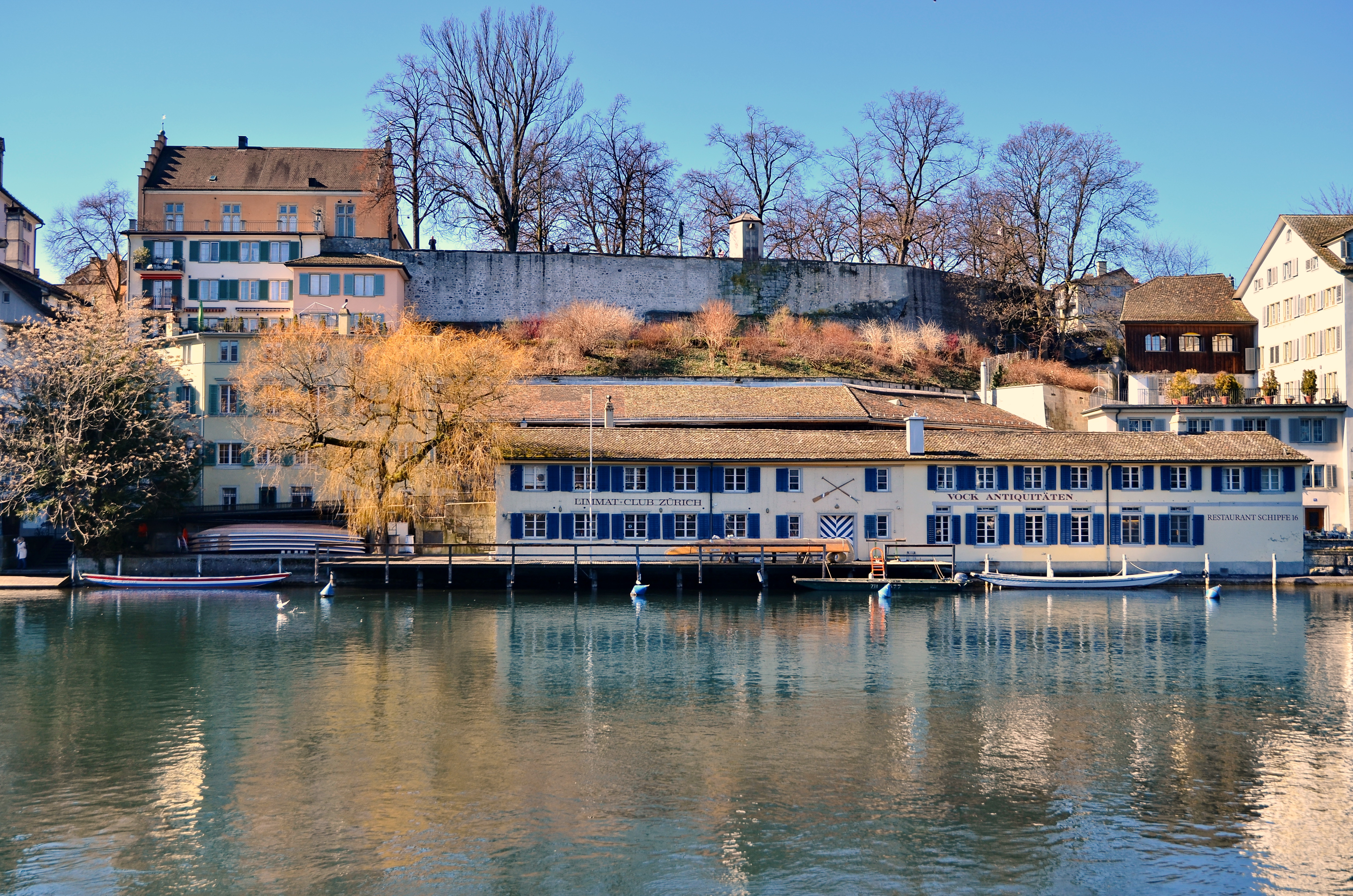
Lindenhof hill and Schipfe as seen from Limmatquai

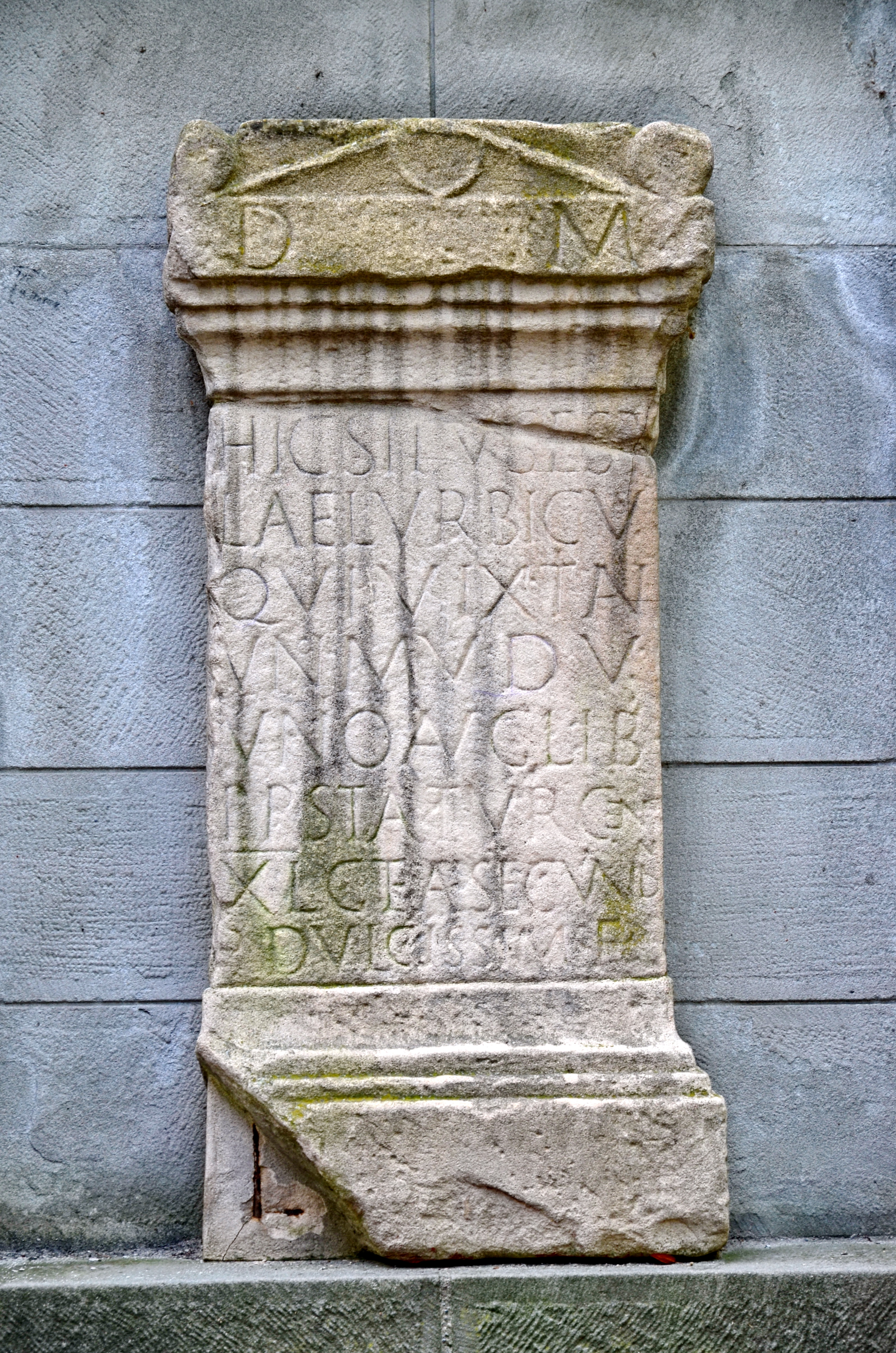
Modern replica of the Roman gravestone in Pfalzgasse on Lindenhof hill in Zurich

The core of the Helvetic and Roman settlement was the Lindenhof hill in the present Altstadt of the modern city of Zurich. The moraine hill was the site of the prehistoric settlements where the modern city has developed. The hilltop area dominates the city of Zurich alongside the eastern Limmat riverbank, and its northern slope called Sihlbühl towards the former Sihl delta marked the northern boundary of the Helvetic and Roman settlement – where the structures of the medieval Oetenbach Nunnery, Waisenhaus Zürich and later the Urania Sternwarte were erected at the present Uraniastrasse, and therefore important historical archaeological excavations never were done. To the south, at the St. Peter church hill, there was another cultic construction towards Münsterhof, and in the west the settlement was bounded by the present Rennweg–Bahnhofstrasse lanes and the Münzplatz plaza.

The largely flattened Lindenhof area elevates at 428 metres (1,404 ft) above sea level, and rises about 25 metres (82 ft) above the level of the Limmat at the Schipfe–Limmatquai area in the west; probably some Roman buildings were built at the site of the Zunfthaus zur Zimmerleuten on the other riverbank, and the Roman settlement may have stretched towards the present Münsterbrücke which is crossing the Limmat between Grossmünster (remains of graves) and Wasserkirche, and the Münsterhof plaza.

== Roman Vicus ==
=== Founding ===
The earliest record of the town's name is preserved on the 2nd-century tombstone found in 1747 AD on the Lindenhof hill, referring to the Roman Vicus as "STA(tio) TUR(i)CEN(sis)" as customs station for goods going to and coming from Italy at the same location as the Celtic Oppidum. The Vicus was founded probably around 15 BC, but there are no written sources. The Roman settlement first belonged to the province of Gallia Belgica, and to Germania Superior from AD 90. Roman Turicum was not fortified in the beginning, but there was a small garrison at the tax-collecting point, downstream of the lake respectively Limmat nearby the Münsterhof plaza where the goods were loaded between small river boats on the Limmat and larger ships on Lake Zurich for the transport on the water route.

=== 1st to late 4th century ===
Commercial and residential buildings were erected in the vicinity of the Lindenhof hill, in later times, Villae rusticae were established in the present suburban districts. At the present Zunfthaus zur Zimmerleuten at Limmatquai opposite of the Lindenhof hill, the area was stabilized with embankments; some of these mounds date back to the Roman settlement era. Due to its location on Lake Zurich lake shore at the effluence of the Limmat, where the goods had to be reloaded onto riverboats, and although Turicum was not situated alongside an important Roman main road, the water route was essential for the Roman army in the present Western and Northeastern Switzerland. Not yet archaeologically proven but suggested by historians, the very first construction of the present Münsterbrücke Limmat crossing was built in the Roman era, when the present Weinplatz square was the former civilian harbour of the Celtic-Roman Turicum, and so the term Weinplatz (literally wine plaza) has an ancient meaning.

As a Vicus, Turicum was not secured by town walls, but the buildings grouped around the customs station (Quadragesima Galliarum) where the clearance of goods and travelers prior to transfer between the provinces of Gallia Belgica and Raetia took place, mainly on the water route (from and to the Roman heartland over the mountain passes of the Swiss Alps) Walensee-Obersee-Lake Zurich passing Centum Prata (Kempraten) towards the Limmat, Aare and Rhine. Goods and travelers, probably also towards Vitudurum (Winterthur), were handled at the Vicus before crossing the Roman provinces of Gallia Belgica and Germania Superior, and transferred on the Roman road between Vindonissa (Windisch) probably via Irgenhausen Castrum and Curia Raetorum (Chur). In Turicum a duty of 2.5% (Quadragesima Galliarum) was levied.

In 70/75 AD a harbor district rose on the newly acquired lands on the Limmat riverbank at the foot of Lindenhof (Schipfe–Weinplatz), and the settlement area was extended on the right bank of the Limmat at the present Limmatquai. Public buildings made of stone and paved roads were built. In addition to the fire bed tombs from the 1st century AD at Münsterhof (Poststrasse), west of the Fraumünster church, also a round pit from the 2nd/3rd century was discovered, with numerous shards mainly of drinking cups and bowls, northeast of the church.

At the site of the present Weinplatz towards St. Peterhofstatt the remains of remarkable 2nd to 4th century AD Thermae were excavated. Christianity may have been introduced in the 3rd century by Felix and Regula, with whom Exuperantius was associated – according to the Christian legend, Felix and Regula and their servant were executed at the location of the Wasserkirche in 286. Using the advantage of topography, the Roman military built a citadel on top of the Lindenhof hill in the years of the Roman emperor Valentinian I (364–375), to defend against migrations from the North by the Alamanni. 4500 m^{2} large, it was fitted with 10 towers and two meter wide walls. South of the Lindenhof Castrum, at the location of the St. Peter church, there was a temple to Jupiter.

=== Grosser Hafner island sanctuary ===
An island sanctuary of the Helvetii in connection with settlement the preceding Oppidi Lindenhof and the 1st century BC settlement at the Lindenhof hill may have probably go back to the La Tène culture. During the reign of Emperor Hadrian, a round wooden temple as an island sanctuary was built on the Grosser Hafner island, which allows a dendrochronological dating. The building was erected in 122 AD, and consisted of oak piles driven deep into the lake bottom. It was surrounded probably with walls made of perishable materials, which formed a circle of seven meters in diameter. The rotunda is located on the former Neolithic island settlement, about 500 metres (1,640 ft) away from the Roman Vicus. The archaeological material indicates that the facility was used up in the 3rd century AD, even up in the 4th century AD by the Gallo-Roman population. On the one hand, the interpretation as the temple is based on the insularity and the design, on the other hand on finds of coins; the majority of the now nearly 90 coins probably are from a so far not proven predecessor building, probably from the third quarter of the 1st century AD. There are also the fragments of bar tiles of maybe another Roman building. On occasion of diving operations from 1998 to 2001 almost 100 kilograms (220 lb) of tile fragments are ensured, and up to 40 coins and several pottery shards, as well as rectangular post hole.

=== Gallo-Roman era ===
The Alamanni settled, probably from the 5th century when the Roman military retreated back to Italy, but the Roman castle persisted into the 7th century and was reinforced by the Ottonian dynasty, but was broken around 1218 AD. To date, few archaeological remains of the Roman Zurich could be excavated systematically because the remains of the settlement are hidden under the densely built-up core of the modern city of Zurich. Archaeologically excavated are the remains of public baths (Thermengasse), graves and traces of craft enterprises, residential buildings, as well as everyday objects and jewelry, but also of cult equipment.

== Archaeological exploration ==
Archaeological excavations usually were executed on occasion of renewals of present buildings at Rennweg 5/7 (settlement structures), Fortunagasse 28/Rennweg 38 and Oetenbachgasse 5–9 (Celtic trench and settlement structures), Münzplatz (settlement structures), Lindenhof hill (Celtic, Roman and medieval settlement structures), Rennweg 35 (Celtic spot plates (Tüpfelplatten) and settlement structures), the Limmat (bars) and Bürkliplatz-Bahnhofstrasse (Celtic Potin coins), all representing the Helvetii and early Roman settlement. Focussed on the Gallo-Roman era, archaeological explorations were executed at Weinplatz 3/4/5 and Storchengasse 23 (harbour area and thermae), Storchengasse 13 (cultic building) and neighbored Fortunagasse 28/Rennweg 38 (maybe a hostel) and gold jewellery at the Sihlbühl area, Poststrasse/Zentralhof at Münsterhof (probably early medieval graves), and the island sanctuary (Rundtempel) on the former Grosser Hafner island.

Some of the finds are shown in situ at the Thermengasse lane (Weinplatz towards St. Peterhofstatt), and in the so-called Lindenhofkeller on the Lindenhof hill where the Celtii, Gallo-Roman and Carolinum walls are shown and explained by information boards by personal demand at Baugeschichtliches Archiv der Stadt Zürich opposite of the Grimmenturm respectively Theater Neumarkt buildings (Neumarkt).

== Protection ==
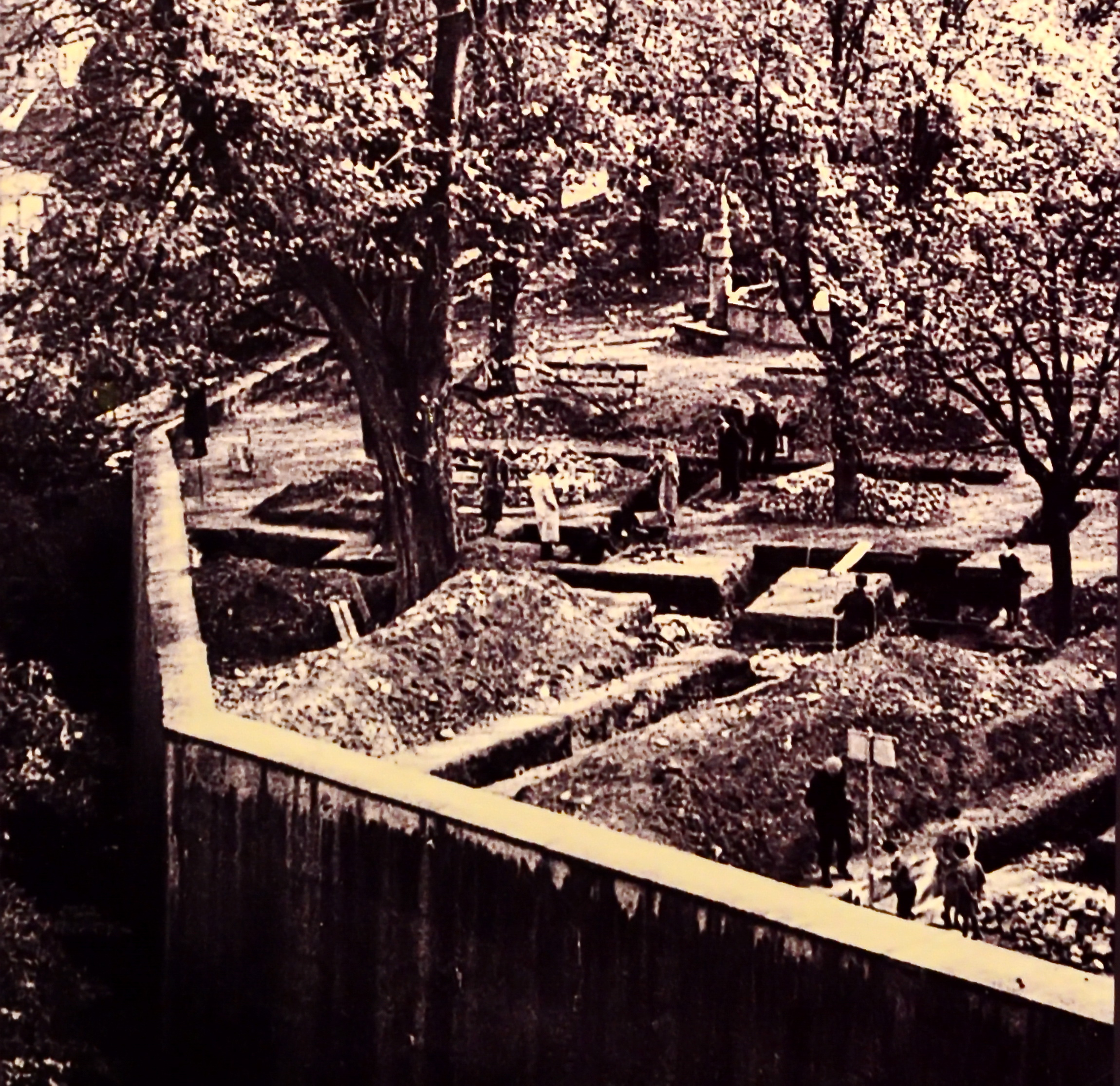
Excavation in winter 1937/38 on the Lindenhof hill

The hillside area of the Lindenhof hill is listed as in the Swiss inventory of cultural property of national and regional significance – including the remains of its prehistoric, Roman and medieval settlements respectively structures – as a Class A object of national importance. Hence, the area is provided as a historical site under federal protection, within the meaning of the Swiss Federal Act on the nature and cultural heritage (German: Bundesgesetz über den Natur- und Heimatschutz NHG) of 1 July 1966. Unauthorised researching and purposeful gathering of findings represent a criminal offence according to Art. 24.

== Name ==
The ancient name Turicum, along with the indication of a Roman customhouse, is first attested in the epitaph for Lucius Aelius Urbicus, an infant son of the p(rae)p(ositus) sta(tionis) Turicen(sis), "head of the toll-station at Zurich", that was found on Lindenhof hill in 1747 and dates from 185/200 AD.

The place name reappears in the Early Middle Ages as Turicum, Turico, Doricum, Torico, Turigo, Turegum, and in its Old High German forms Ziurichi, Zurih, with regularly shifted consonants; it is unanimously seen as a Gaulish formation, *Turikon, though vowel quantities and accentuation have been a matter of debate: Stress on the second syllable in Rumantsch Turitg, Turi, as well as in the partially reshaped Italian form Zurigo, have been taken as evidence establishing originally long -ī-, that would have drawn the accent to the penult in Latin pronunciation; the constituting elements of the toponym have been identified as a Celtic personal name Tūros and a suffix -īko- forming relational adjectives. This analysis has been contested by arguing that the spelling Turegum, widely attested in documents from the 9th century onward, seems to reflect lenition of the intervocalic stop consonant, as well as lowering of short Latin ĭ to ĕ, both common to most Western Romance languages, and that numerous other place names of Celtic origin, as Autricum, Avaricum or Aventicum, are undoubtedly formed with a suffix -ĭko-, and are usually derived from a hydronym; thus the basis of Turicum supposedly being Turos or Tura, should rather be an ancient name of one of the watercourses around Lindenhof hill, either a distributary of the Sihl river, or possibly the Limmat river. The Romansh and Italian forms may likely have been taken from medieval written records, with the accent determined by analogy within the borrowing languages, e. g. Turitg after amitg, 'friend', which bears its stress on the second syllable, too. The diverging evolution of several place names of Gaulish origin, as Bourges < Bitúriges, Berry < Bituríges; Condes < Cóndate, Condé < Condáte, suggests that shifting accent and unsettled vowel quantity may not have been exceptional.

== See also ==
- Lindenhof hill
- Oppidum Zurich-Lindenhof
- List of Roman sites

== Sources ==
- Margrit Balmer: Zürich in der Spätlatène- und frühen Kaiserzeit. Vom keltischen Oppidum zum römischen Vicus Turicum. In: Monographien der Kantonsarchäologie Zürich 39, Hochbaudepartement/Amt für Städtebau/Stadtarchäologie (Hrsg.), Fotorotar-Verlag, Zürich und Egg 2009, ISBN 978-3-905681-37-6.
- Peter J. Suter, Helmut Schlichtherle et al.: Pfahlbauten – Palafittes – Palafitte. Palafittes, Biel 2009, ISBN 978-3-906140-84-1.
- Dölf Wild et al.: Stadtmauern. Ein neues Bild der Stadtbefestigung Zürich. Schrift zur Ausstellung im Haus zum Rech, Zürich 6. Februar bis 30. April 2004. In: Stadtgeschichte und Städtebau in Zürich. Schriften zur Archäologie, Denkmalpflege und Stadtplanung. Volume 5. Werd-Verlag, Zürich 2004, ISBN 3-905384-05-1.
- Beat Eberschweiler: Ur- und frühgeschichtliche Verkehrswege über den Zürichsee: Erste Ergebnisse aus den Taucharchäologischen Untersuchungen beim Seedamm. In: Mitteilungen des Historischen Vereins des Kantons Schwyz, Volume 96, Schwyz 2004.
- Margrit Balmer, Stefanie Martin-Kilcher, Dölf Wild: Kelten in Zürich. Der Ursprung der Stadt in neuem Licht - Stadtgeschichte und Städtebau in Zürich. In: Schriften zu Archäologie, Denkmalpflege und Stadtplanung, Voluma 2. Published by Amt für Städtebau der Stadt Zürich, Zürich 2001, ISBN 978-3-905384-01-7.* Jürg E. Schneider, Walter Ulrich Guyan, Andreas Zürcher: Turicum, Vitudurum, Iuliomagus = Zürich, Winterthur und Schleitheim: drei römische Siedlungen in der Ostschweiz. Ergänzte Sonderauflage, Werd-Verlag, Zürich 1988, ISBN 3-8593-2002-5.
- Staatsarchiv des Kantons Zürich: Kleine Zürcher Verfassungsgeschichte 1218–2000. Herausgegeben im Auftrag der Direktion der Justiz und des Innern auf den Tag der Konstituierung des Zürcher Verfassungsrates am 13. September 2000. Chronos, Zürich 2000, ISBN 3-9053-1403-7.
