= Grosser Hafner =

Archaeological site in Zurich, Switzerland

Coordinates: 47°21′46.49″N 8°32′34.67″E

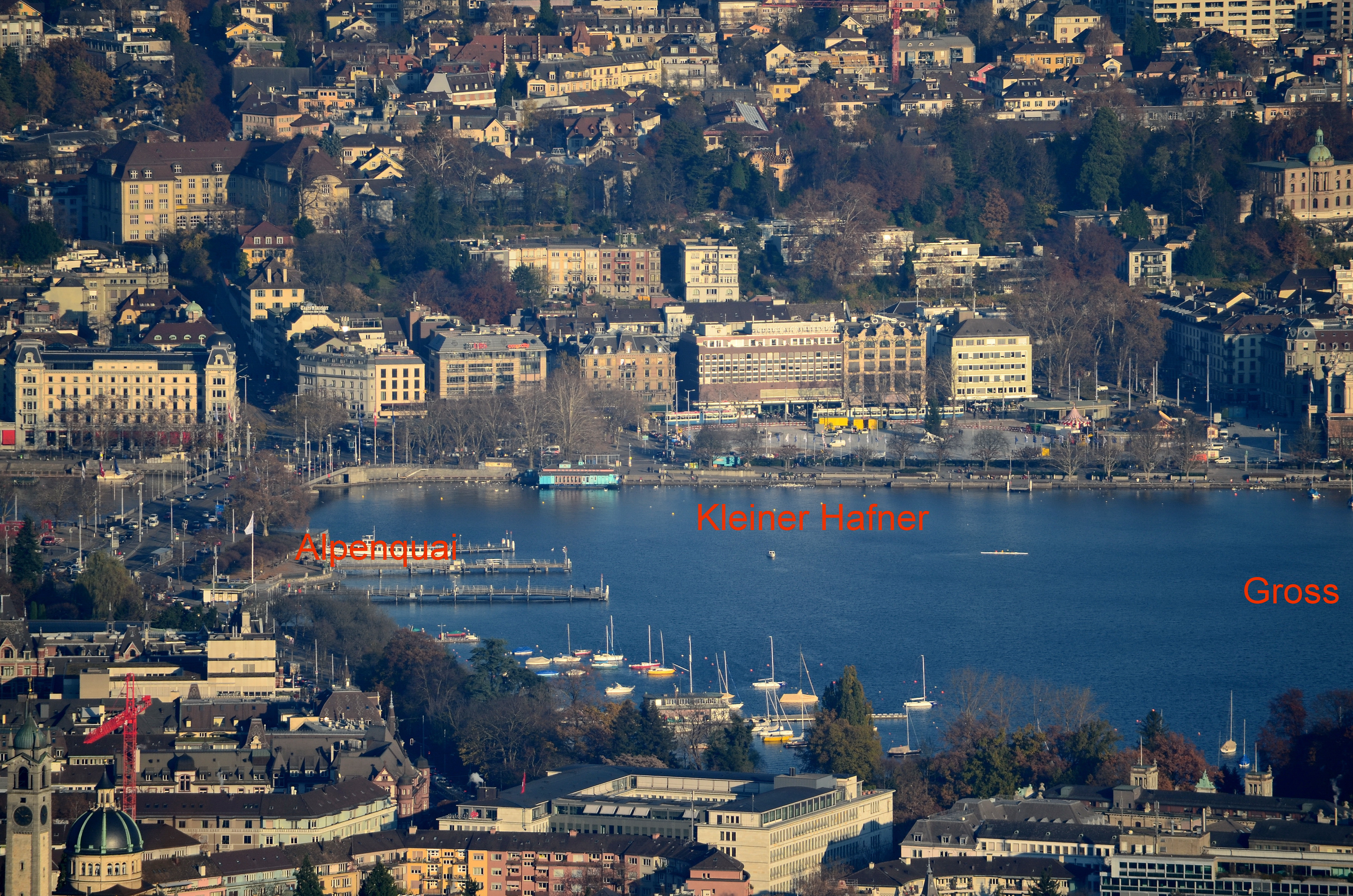
The site of the prehistoric settlement

Grossner Hafner is one of the 111 serial sites of the UNESCO World Heritage Site Prehistoric pile dwellings around the Alps, of which are 56 located in Switzerland.

== Geography ==
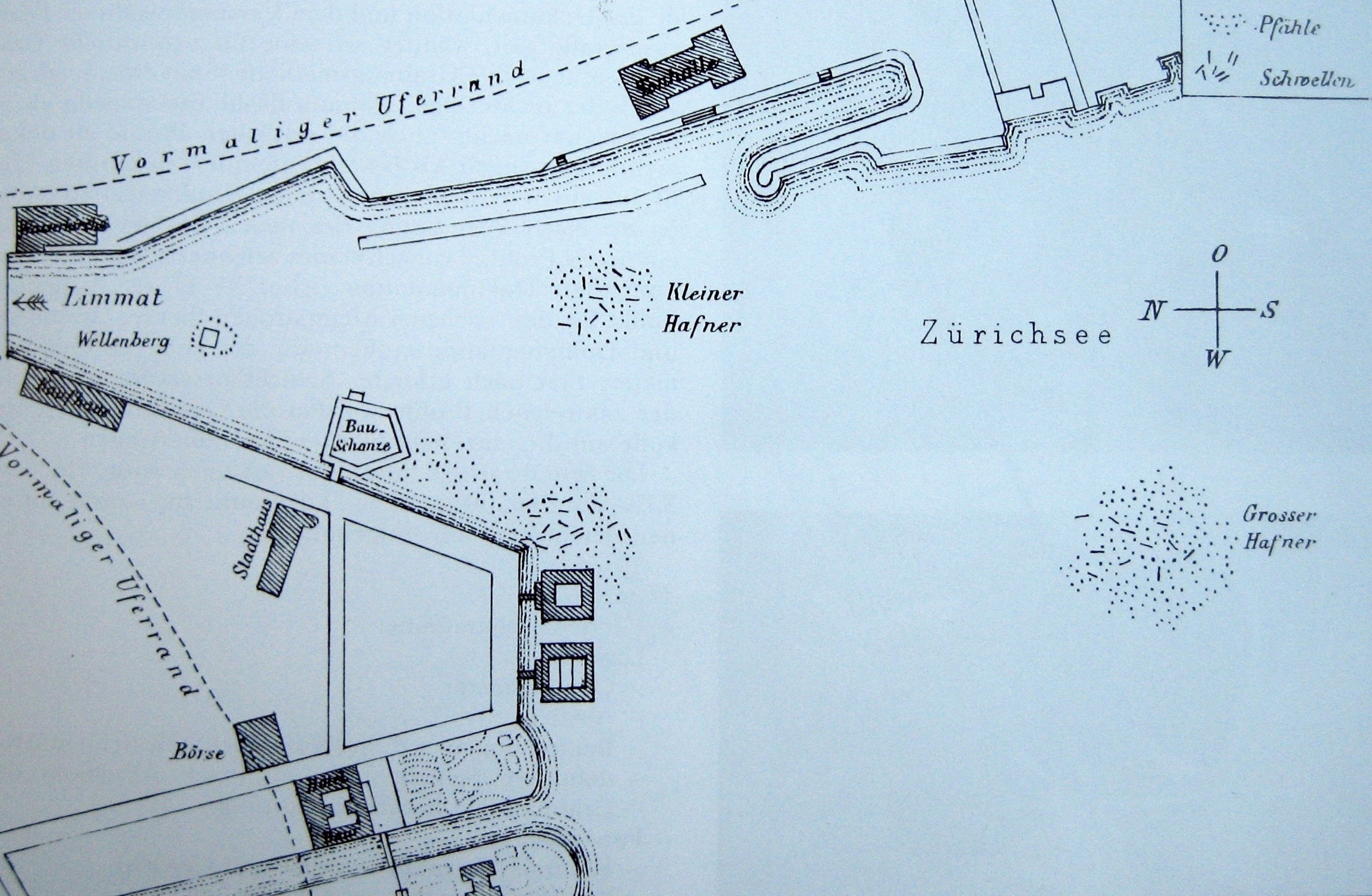
Plan by Ferdinand Keller, 1858

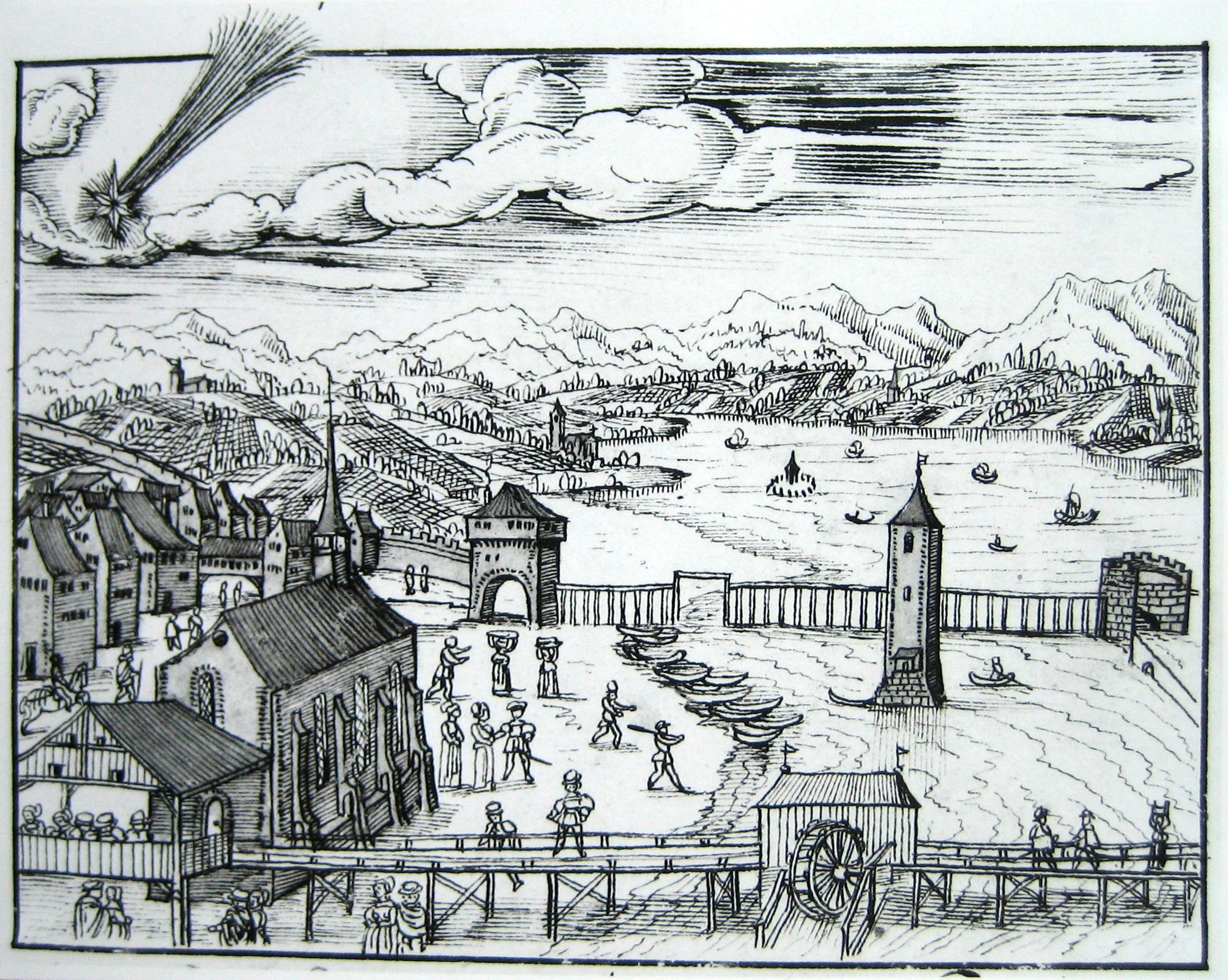
Schweizer Chronik' by Christoph Silberysen, 1576

Grosser Hafner was located on the then swamp area between the Limmat and Lake Zurich around Sechseläutenplatz on a small lake island in Zurich, and as well as the other Prehistoric pile dwellings around Lake Zurich set on piles to protect against occasional flooding by the Linth and Jona. The settlement is located on Lake Zurich in Enge, a locality of the municipality of Zurich. It was neighbored by the settlements Zürich–Enge Alpenquai and Kleiner Hafner on a then island in the effluence of the Limmat, within an area of about 0.2 square kilometres (49.42 acres) in the city of Zurich. Grosser and Kleiner Hafner comprise 0.64 hectares (1.58 acres), and the buffer zone including the lake area comprises 16.56 hectares (40.92 acres) in all.

== History ==
Internationally known is the area since 2009, as in the beginning of the construction of the underground parking facility at Sechseläutenplatz the remains of Prehistoric pile dwellings around Lake Zurich, in the immediate vicinity of the wetland soil settlement Kleiner Hafner in the lower basin of Lake Zurich, were found. Instead of a rescue excavation, the construction works were suspended for nine months and the settlement remains were systematically archaeologically recorded; the results of the excavations are permanently shown in the pavilion to the lakeshore.

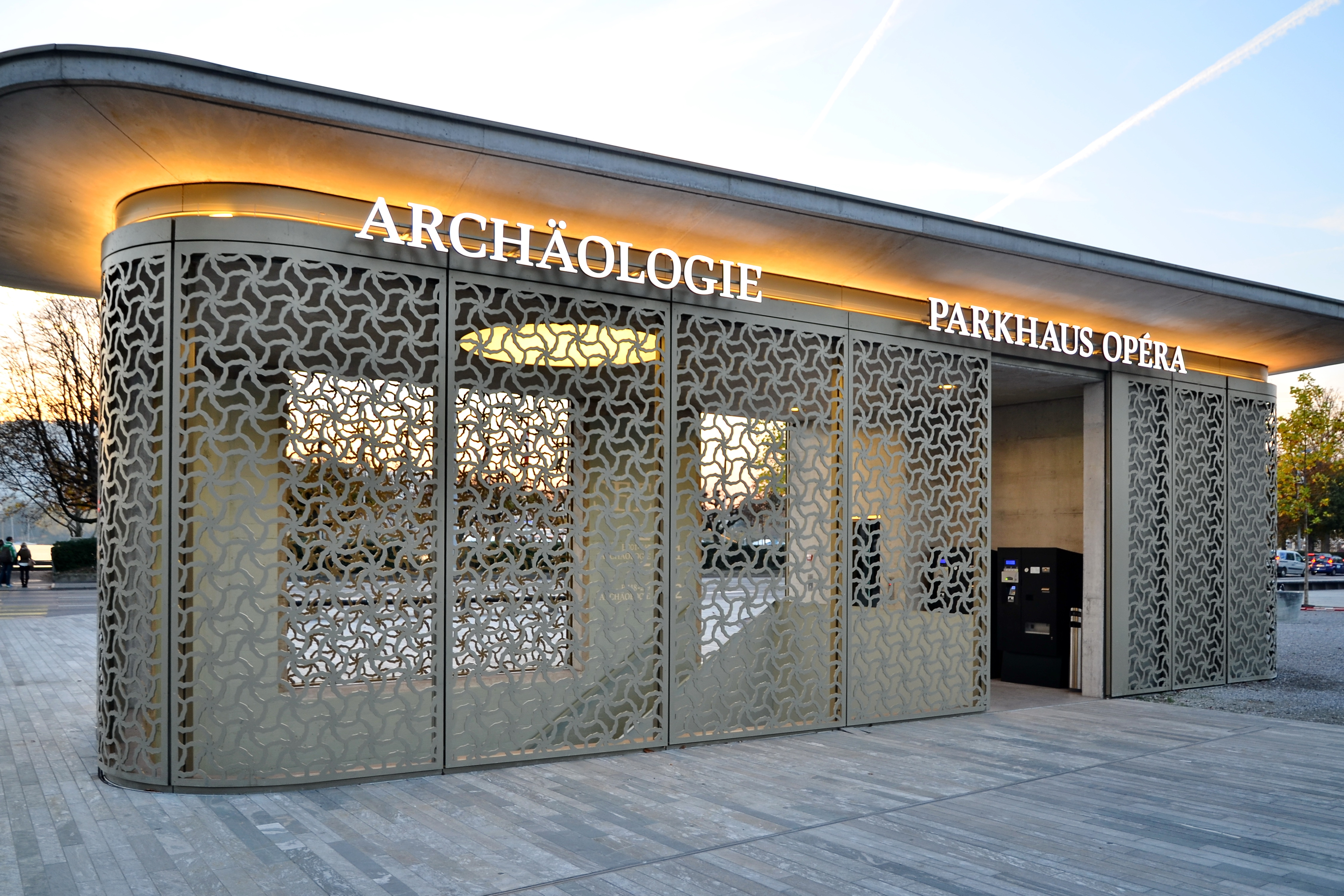
Entrance to the archaeological exhibition

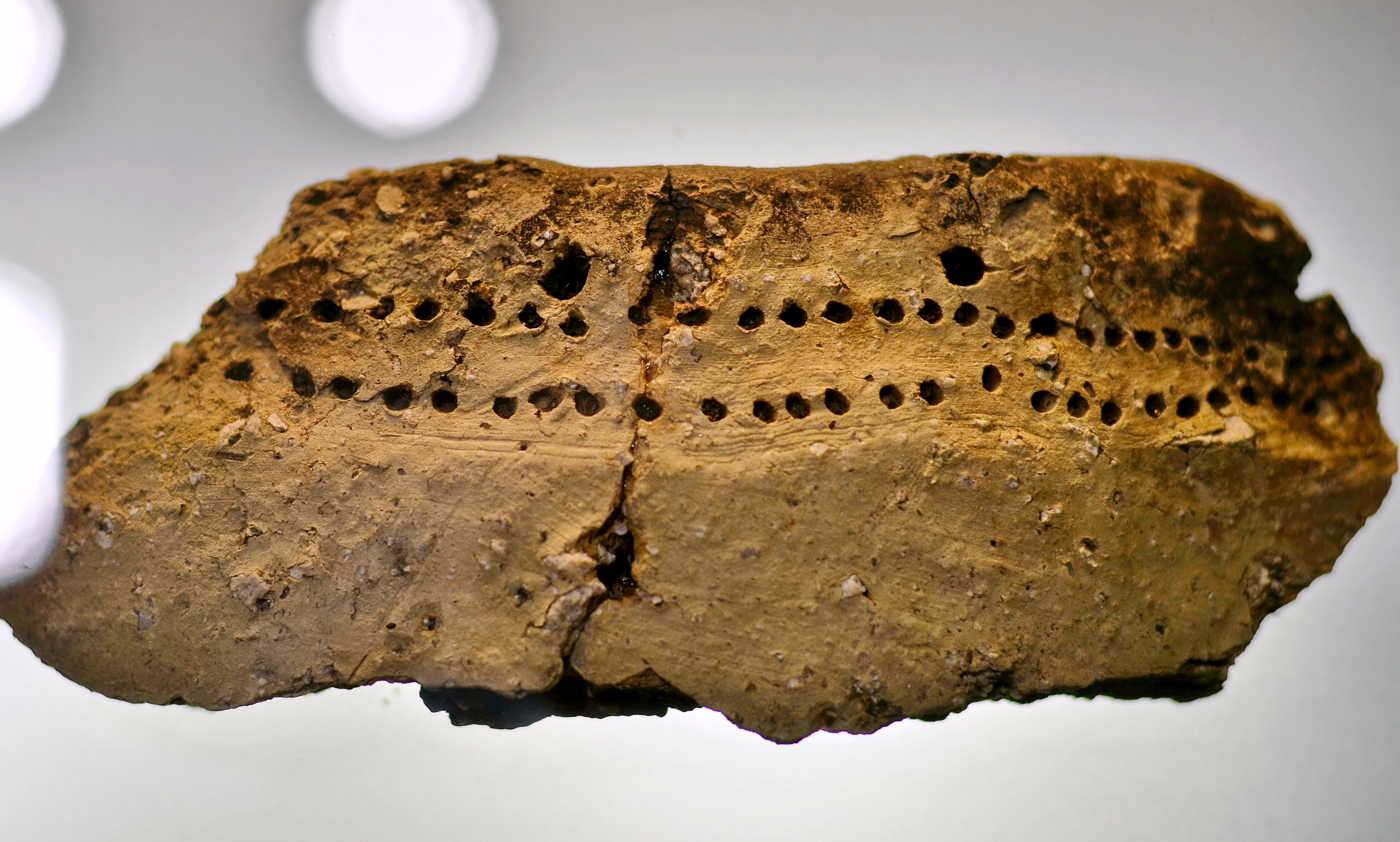
Horgen culture, fragment of ceramics

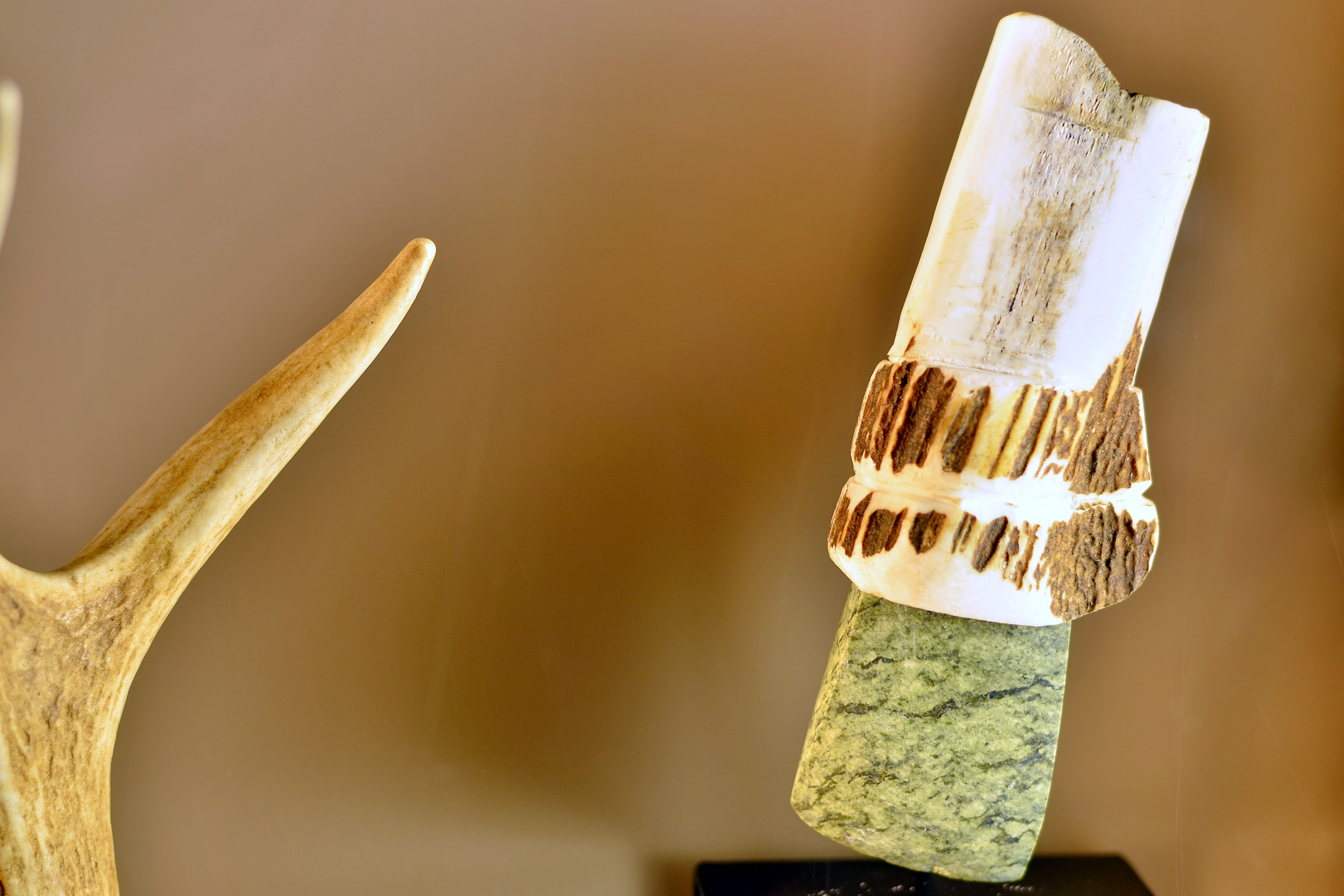
Horgen culture, fragment of a shafted stone axe

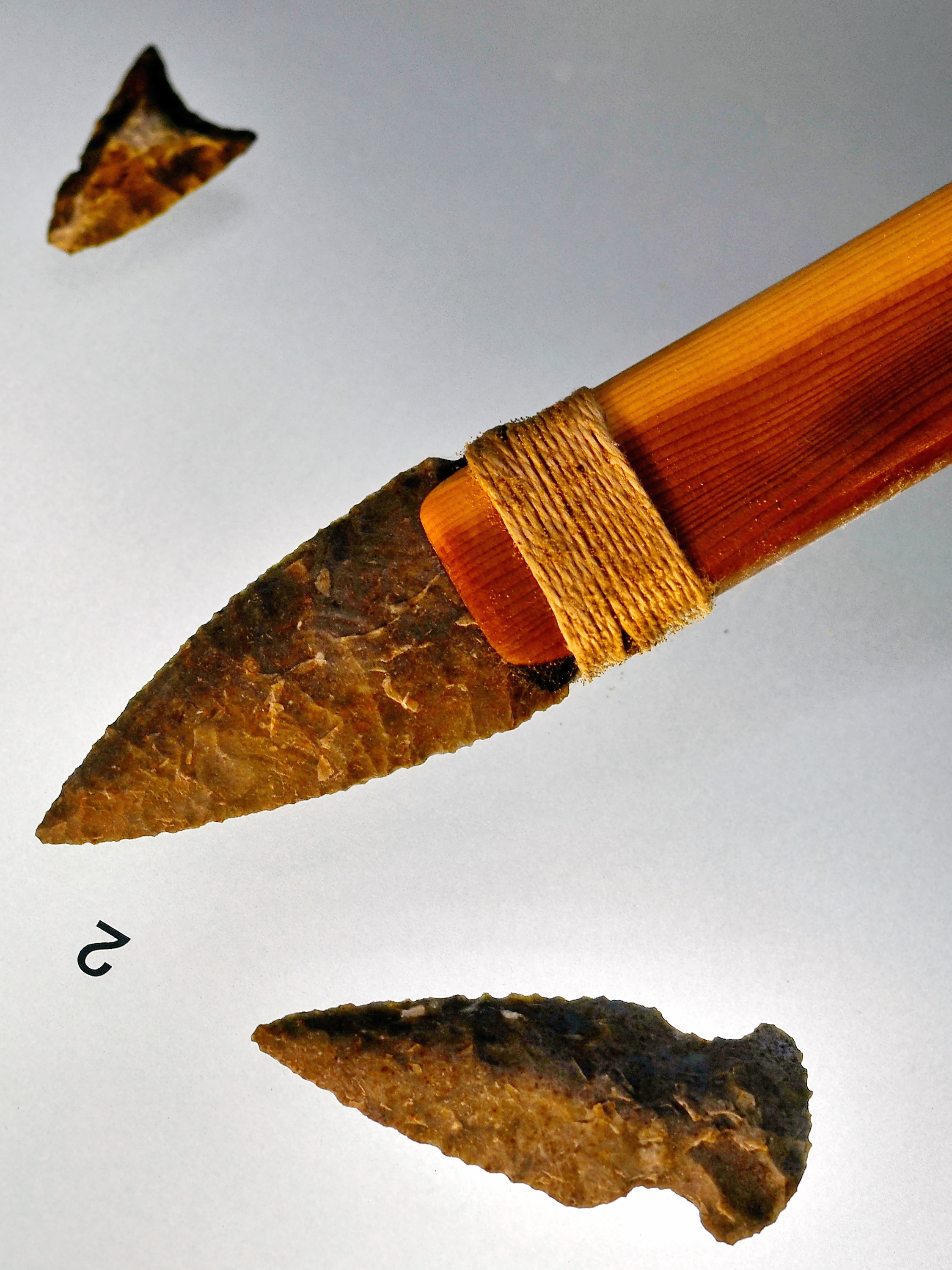
Horgen culture, silex knife and stone arrowheads

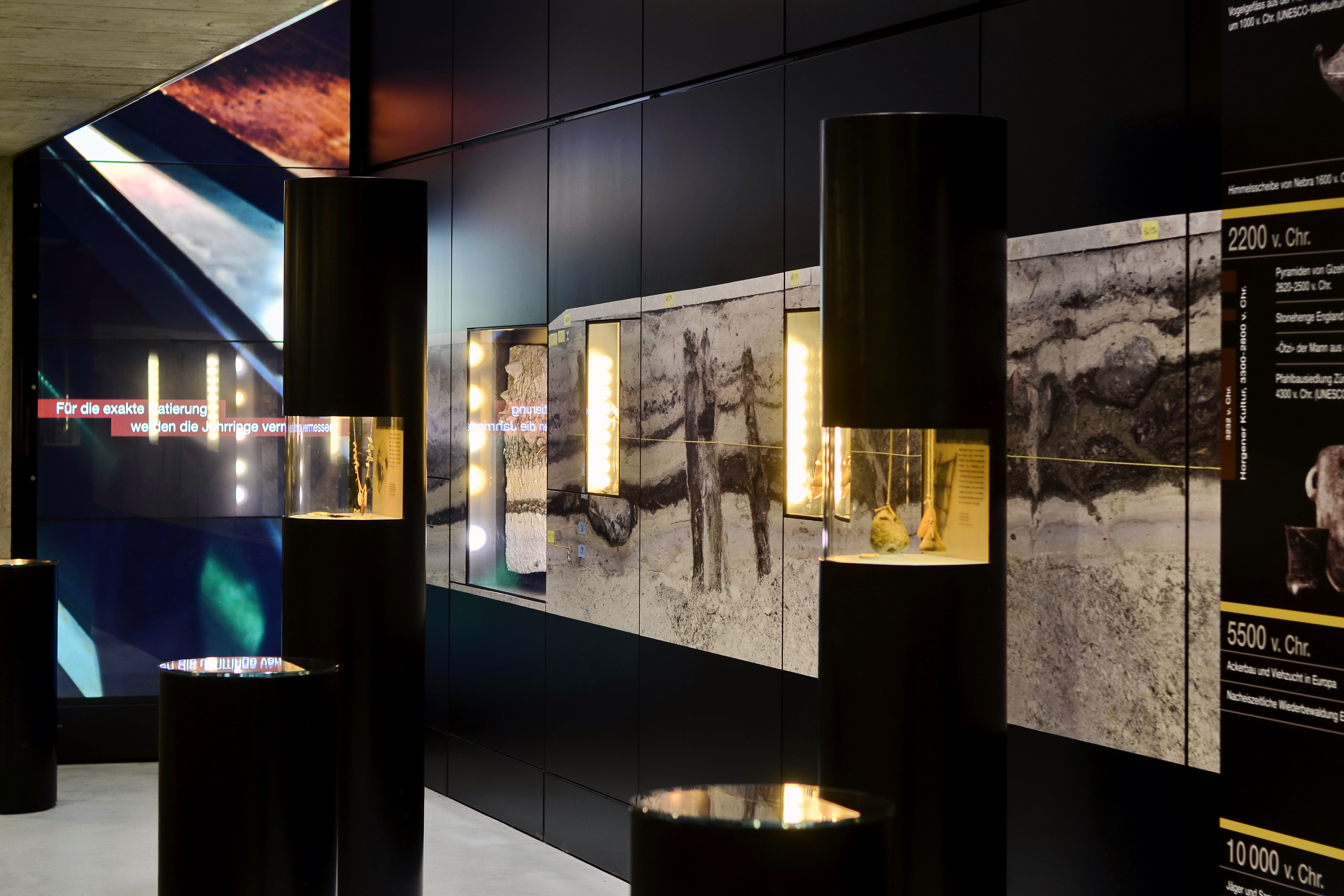
multimedia presentation at the lakeshore pavilion

== Roman island sanctuary ==
In Roman time, during the reign of Emperor Hadrian, a round wooden temple as an island sanctuary was built at the Hafner island, which allows a dendrochronological dating. The building was erected in 122 AD, and consisted of oak piles driven deep into the lake bottom. It was surrounded probably with walls made of perishable materials, which formed a circle of seven meters in diameter. The rotunda is located on the former island settlement, about 500 meters away from the Vicus Turicum. The archaeological material indicates that the facility sure may was used up in the 3rd century AD, even up in the 4th century AD by the Gallo-Roman population. On the one hand, the interpretation as the temple is based on the insularity and the design, on the other hand on finds of coins; the majority of the now nearly 90 coins probably are from a so far not proven predecessor building, probably from the third quarter of the 1st century AD. There are also the fragments of bar tiles of maybe another Roman building. In the diving operations from 1998 to 2001 almost 100 kilograms of tile fragments are ensured, and up to 40 coins and several pottery shards, as well as rectangular post hole. An island sanctuary of the Helvetii in connection with settlement the preceding Oppidi Uetliberg and the 1st century BC settlement at the Lindenhof hill may have probably go back to the La Tène culture.

== Description ==
Once a former island or peninsula at the estuary of Lake Zurich lakeshore and the Limmat, the settlement Kleiner Hafner represents all periods of pile dwelling. There are finds from the Neolithic Egolzwil, Cortaillod and Horgen cultures forming an important reference assemblage which allows to study the cultural development during the late 5th and early 4th millennia BC.

== Protection ==
The settlement is listed in the Swiss inventory of cultural property of national and regional significance as a Class A object of national importance. Hence, the area is under federal protection as a historical site within the meaning of the Federal Act on the Protection of Nature and Cultural Heritage (German: Bundesgesetz über den Natur- und Heimatschutz NHG) of 1 July 1966.

== See also ==
- Kleiner Hafner
- Prehistoric pile dwellings around Lake Zurich

== Literature ==
- Peter J. Suter, Helmut Schlichtherle et al.: Pfahlbauten – Palafittes – Palafitte. Palafittes, Biel 2009. ISBN 978-3-906140-84-1.
- Beat Eberschweiler: Ur- und frühgeschichtliche Verkehrswege über den Zürichsee: Erste Ergebnisse aus den Taucharchäologischen Untersuchungen beim Seedamm. In: Mitteilungen des Historischen Vereins des Kantons Schwyz, Volume 96, Schwyz 2004.
