= Zürich–Enge Alpenquai =

Enge Alpenquai
UNESCO World Heritage Site
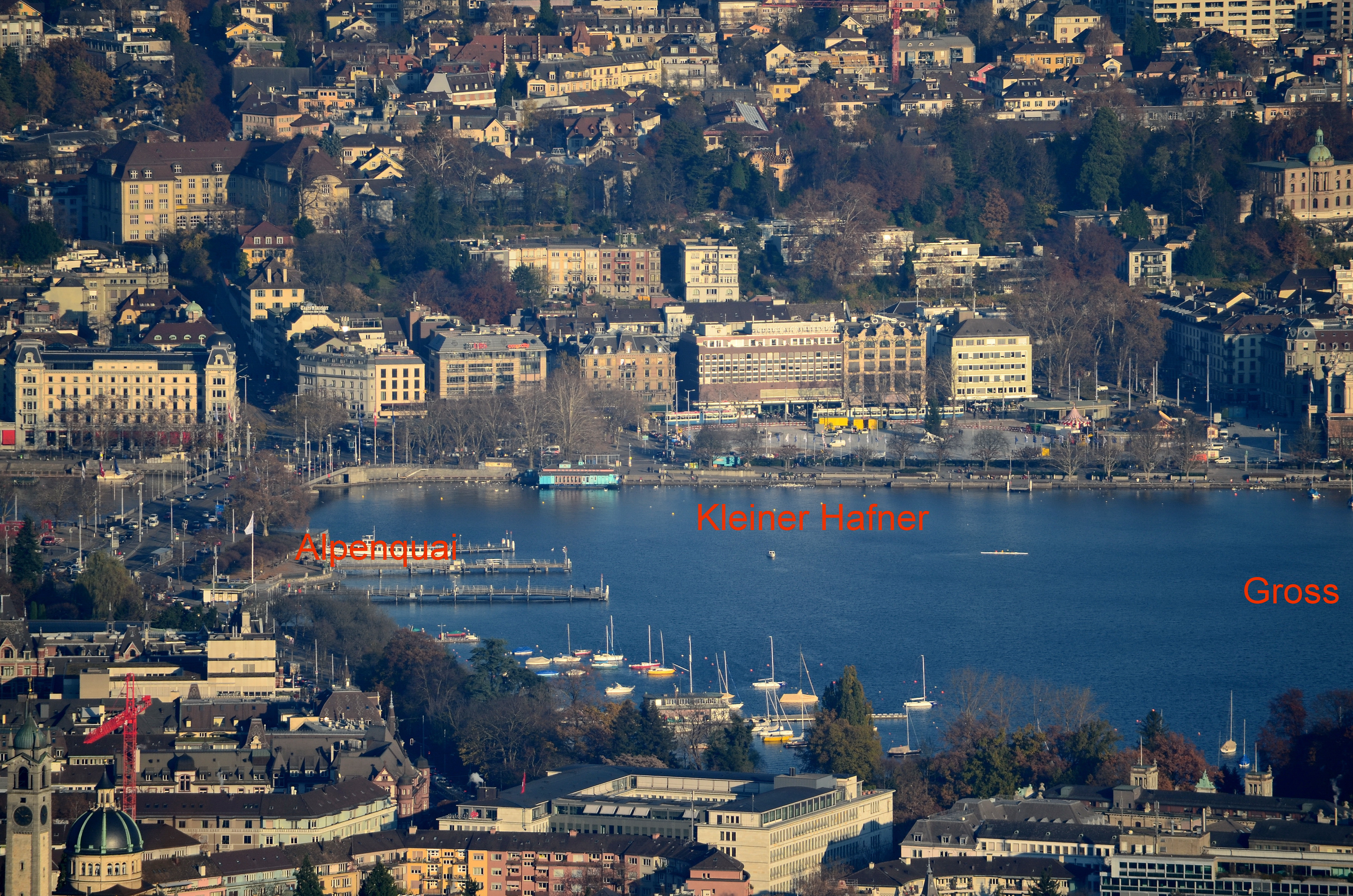
- The site of the prehistoric settlement

- Location within Canton of Zürich Location within Switzerland
- Location: Enge, Zürich, Zürich District, Canton of Zürich, Switzerland
- Part of: Prehistoric Pile Dwellings around the Alps
- Criteria: Cultural: (iv), (v)
- Reference: 1363-055
- Inscription: 2011 (35th Session)
- Area: 2.93 ha (7.2 acres)
- Buffer zone: 17.4 ha (43 acres)
- Website: www.palafittes.org/en/index.html
- Coordinates: 47°21′52.07″N 8°32′19.48″E

Zürich–Enge Alpenquai is one of the 111 serial sites of the UNESCO World Heritage Site Prehistoric pile dwellings around the Alps, of which 56 are located in Switzerland.

== Geography ==
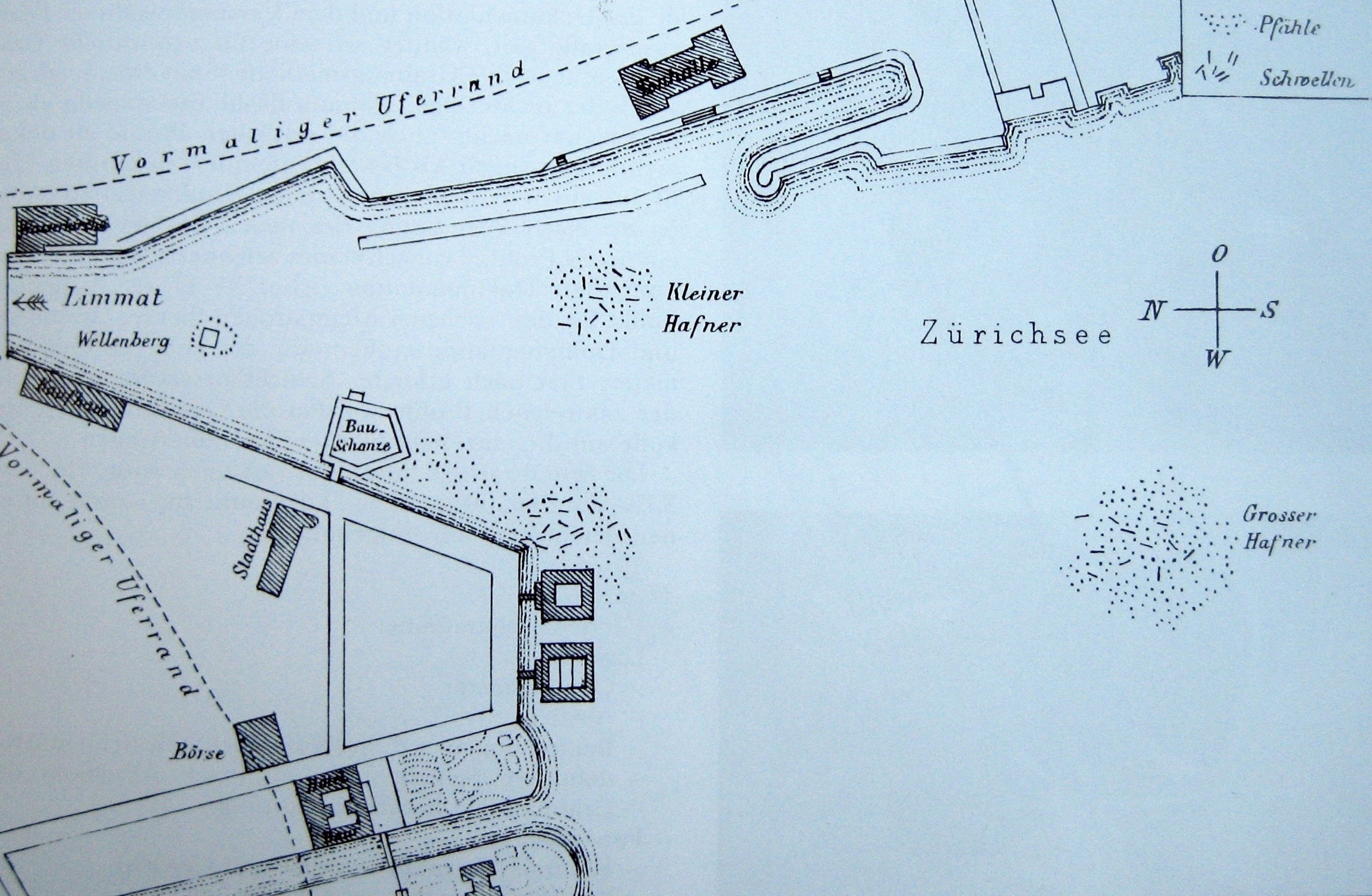
Plan by Ferdinand Keller

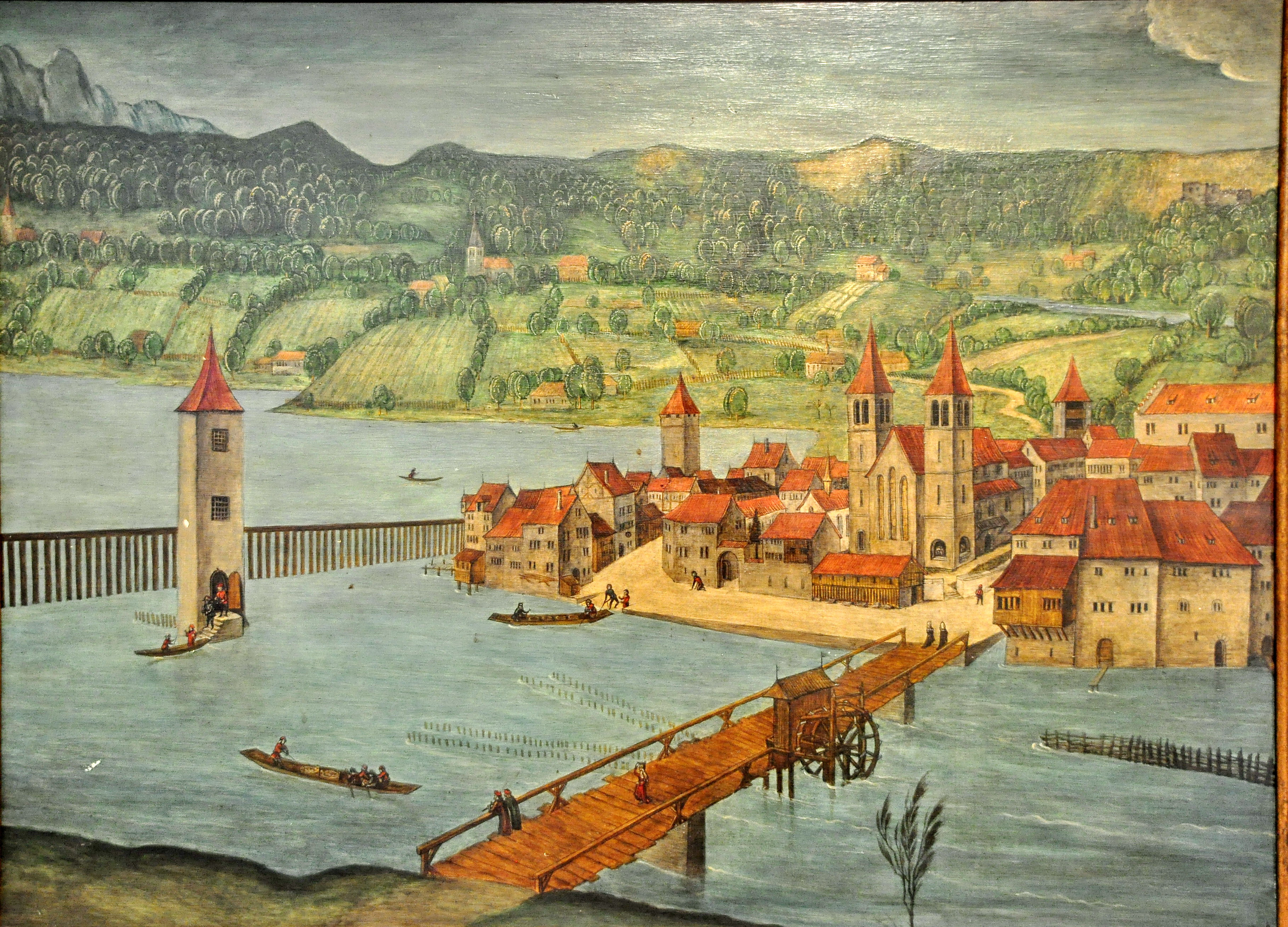
The former site around 1500 AD

Located on the then-swampland between Limmat and Lake Zurich around Sechseläutzenplatz on small islands and peninsulas in Zürich, the settlements were set on piles to protect against occasional flooding by the Linth and Jona Rivers. Because the lake has grown in size over time, most of the original piles are now around 4 metres (13 ft) to 7 metres (23 ft) under the water level of 406 metres (1,332 ft), giving modern observers the false impression that they always had been underwater. Zürich–Enge Alpenquai is located on Lake Zurich lakeshore in Enge, a locality of the municipality of Zürich in the Canton of Zürich in Switzerland. The settlement comprises 2.93 hectares (7.24 acres), and the buffer zone, including the lake area, comprises 17.40 hectares (43.00 acres) in all. It was neighbored by the settlements at Kleiner Hafner and Grosser Hafner on a then peninsula respectively island in the effluence of the Limmat, within an area of about 0.2 square kilometres (49.42 acres) in the city of Zürich.

== Description ==
Alpenquai in the city of Zürich is one of the most important Late Bronze Age lakeside settlements in Central Europe; its huge size and its almost uninterrupted occupation from 1050 BC to 800 BC, rich imports, and the excellent state of preservation of the layers with unique organic finds and architectural elements, mark it as a cultural heritage site of worldwide importance. In addition, the final phase dates from the transition to the Iron Age, a period otherwise rarely found.

== Finds ==
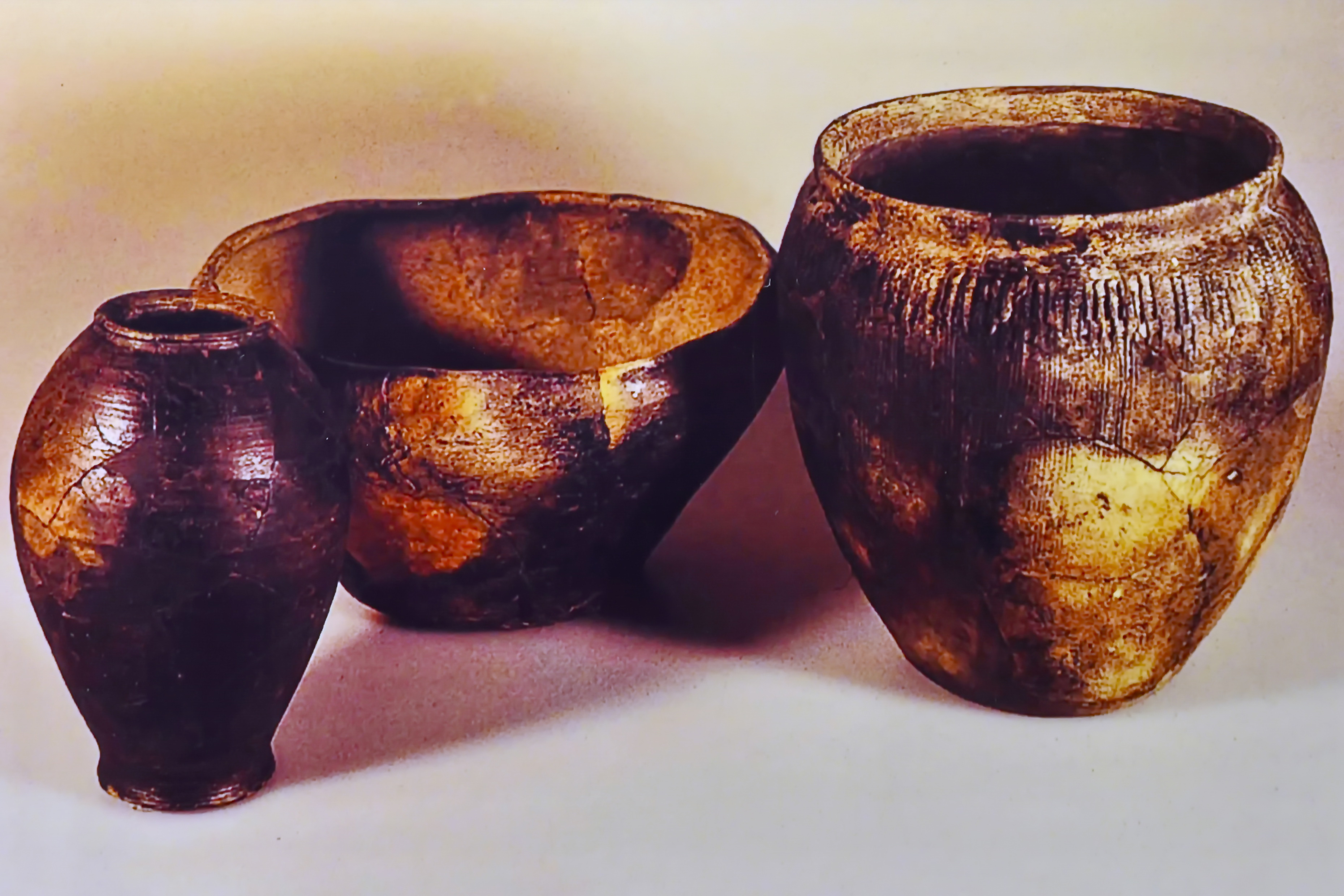
La Tène ceramics from the Lindenhof oppidum

On the occasion of construction works, investigation conducted by probes and probing ditches occurred in 1970. Despite the dredging for the construction of the Seequai between 1916 and 1919, an amazingly big area of approximately 2.8 hectares (7 acres) with two cultural layers, reperesneting distinct eras of settlement, was preserved. Both, the upper and the lower cultural layer, were separated by an about 10 centimetres (3.94 in) cm thick layer of lake marl composed of several layers of different materials. There were found pile shoes, indicators of prehistoric dwellings, at different altitudes in the cultural layers and rich bar decoration of ceramics occurred exclusively in the lower layer, while the decoration on cannelure groups was limited to the upper layer, as well as some graphite-decorated fragments.

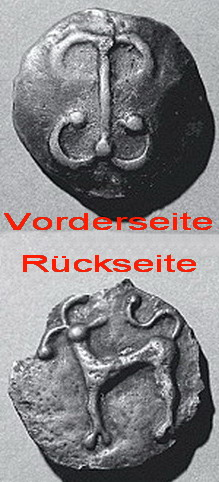
Potin coin of the Zürich Type

So-called Potin lumps, of which the largest weighs 59.2 kilograms (131 lb), were found at Alpenquai in 1890. They consist of a large number of fused Celtic coins, which are mixed with charcoal remnants. Some of the about 18,000 coins originate from Eastern Gaul, while others are of the Zürich type, that were assigned to the local Helvetii, and date to around 100 BC. The find is so far unique, and the scientific research assumes that the melting down of the lumps was not completed, and therefore the aim was to form cultic offerings. The site of the find was at that time at least 50 metres (164 ft) from the lake shore, and probably 1 metre (3 ft) to 3 metres (10 ft) deep in the water.

== Protection ==
As well as being part of the 56 Swiss sites of the UNESCO World Heritage Site Prehistoric pile dwellings around the Alps, the settlement is also listed in the Swiss inventory of cultural property of national and regional significance as a Class A object of national importance. This status declares it a historical site under federal protection under the Swiss Federal Act on Protection of Nature and Cultural Heritage (German: Bundesgesetz über den Natur- und Heimatschutz NHG) of 1 July 1966. Under article 24, intentionally damaging such a site, or artifacts within it, is a criminal offense.

== See also ==
- Bürkliplatz
- Prehistoric pile dwellings around Lake Zurich

== Literature ==
- Peter J. Suter, Helmut Schlichtherle et al.: Pfahlbauten – Palafittes – Palafitte. Palafittes, Biel 2009. ISBN 978-3-906140-84-1.
- Margrit Balmer: Zürich in der Spätlatène- und frühen Kaiserzeit. Vom keltischen Oppidum zum römischen Vicus Turicum. (Monographien der Kantonsarchäologie Zürich 39). Hochbaudepartement der Stadt Zürich, Stadtarchäologie. FO Print & Media AG, Zürich and Egg 2009, ISBN 978-3-905681-37-6.
- Beat Eberschweiler: Ur- und frühgeschichtliche Verkehrswege über den Zürichsee: Erste Ergebnisse aus den Taucharchäologischen Untersuchungen beim Seedamm. In: Mitteilungen des Historischen Vereins des Kantons Schwyz, Volume 96, Schwyz 2004.
