= Enge (Zurich) =

Quarter in Zurich, Switzerland

- Quarter
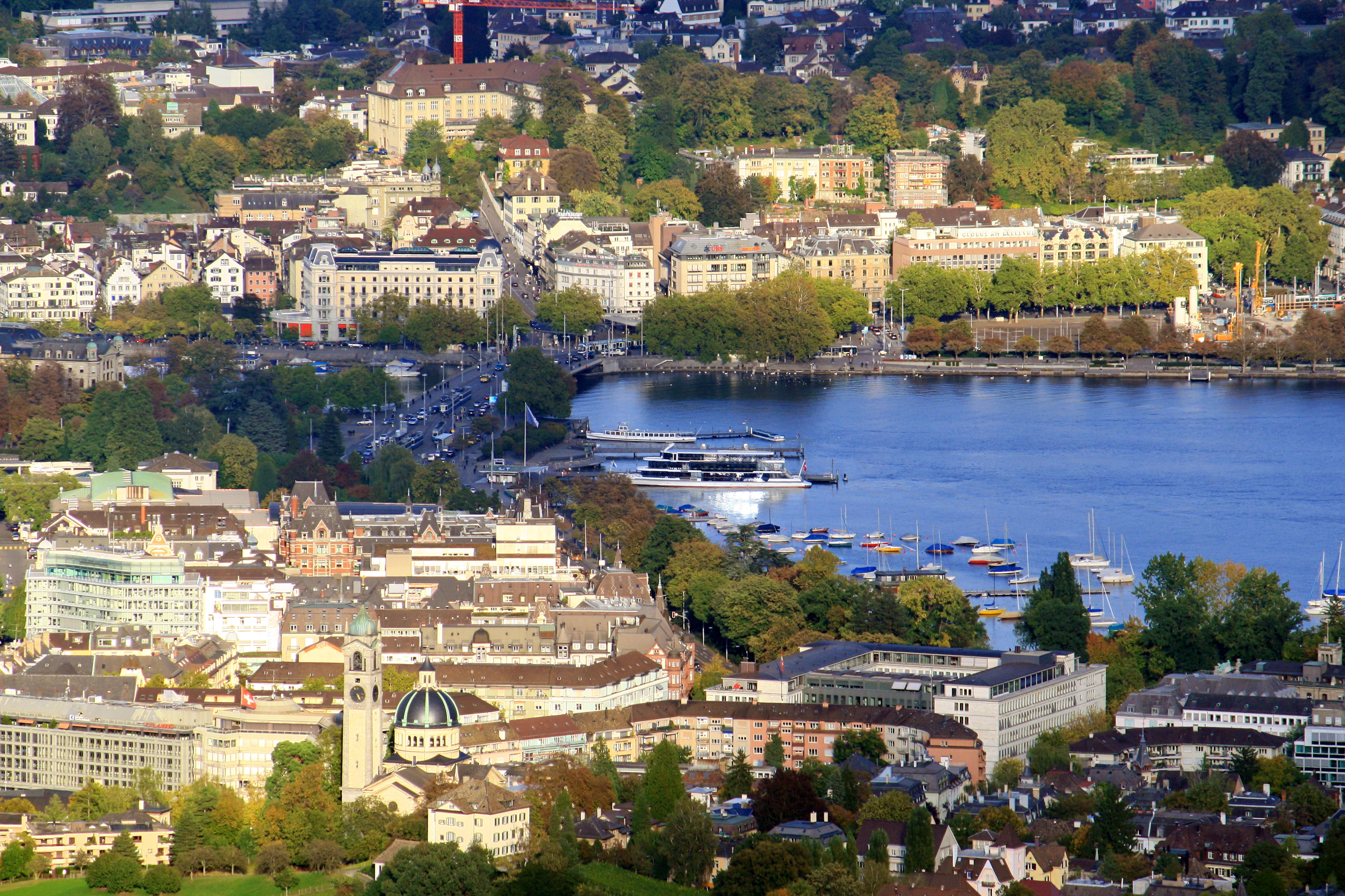
- Enge (in the foreground), Seefeld (to the right) and Rathaus quarters, as seen from Uetliberg; Bürkliplatz, Quaibrücke and Bellevue-Sechseläutenplatz in the centre, as well as the site of the Prehistoric pile dwellings around Lake Zurich

- Flag Coat of arms

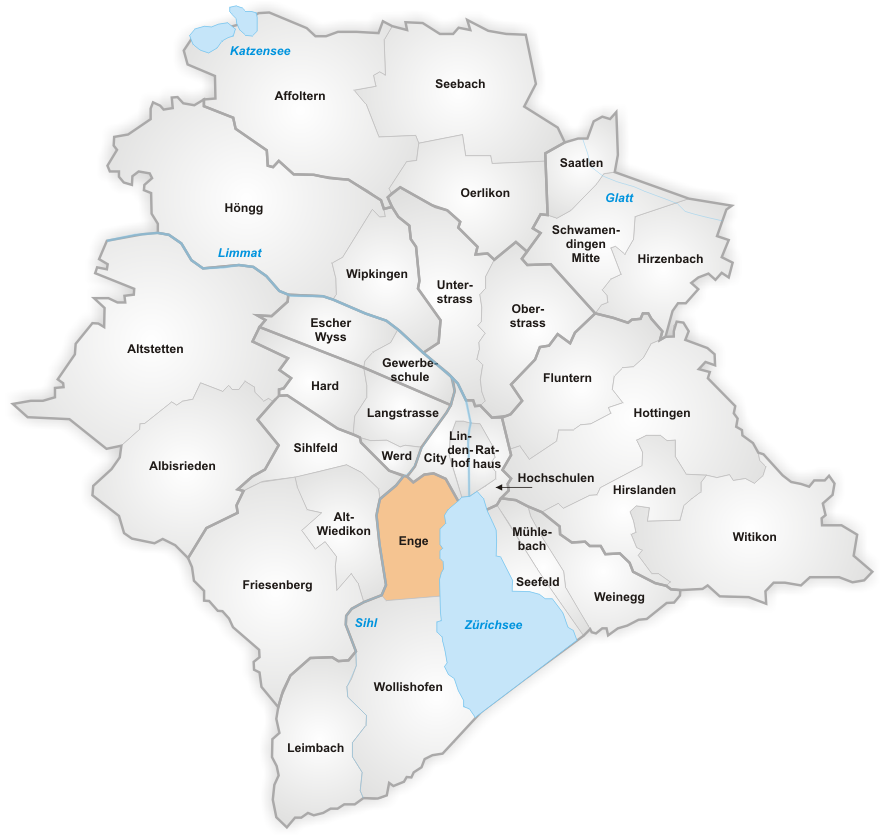
- The quarter of Enge in Zurich
- Coordinates: 47°21′39″N 8°31′47″E
- Country: Switzerland
- Canton: Zurich
- City: Zurich
- District: 2

Aerial view from 1000 m by Walter Mittelholzer (1919)

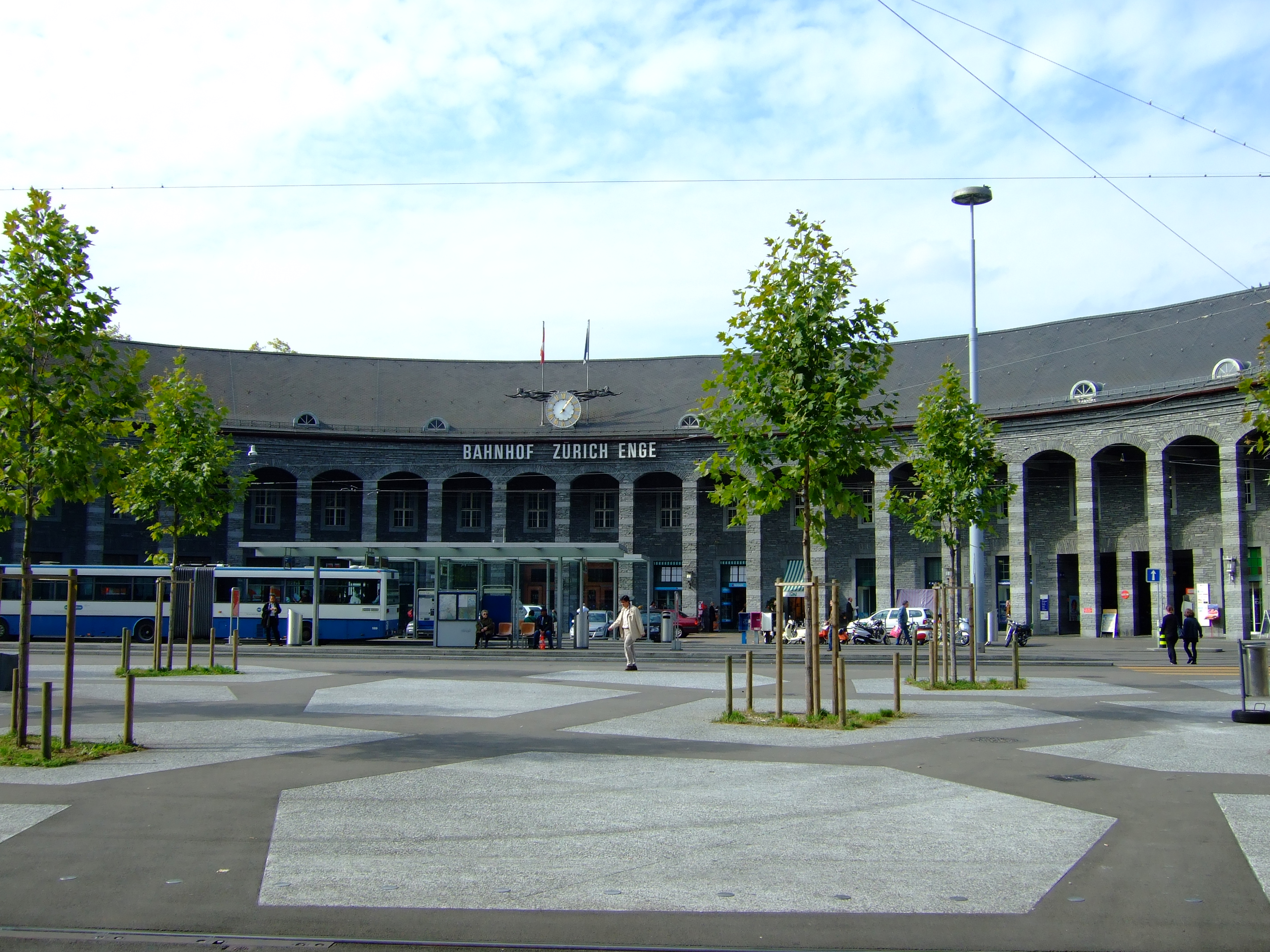
Enge railway station and Tessinerplatz

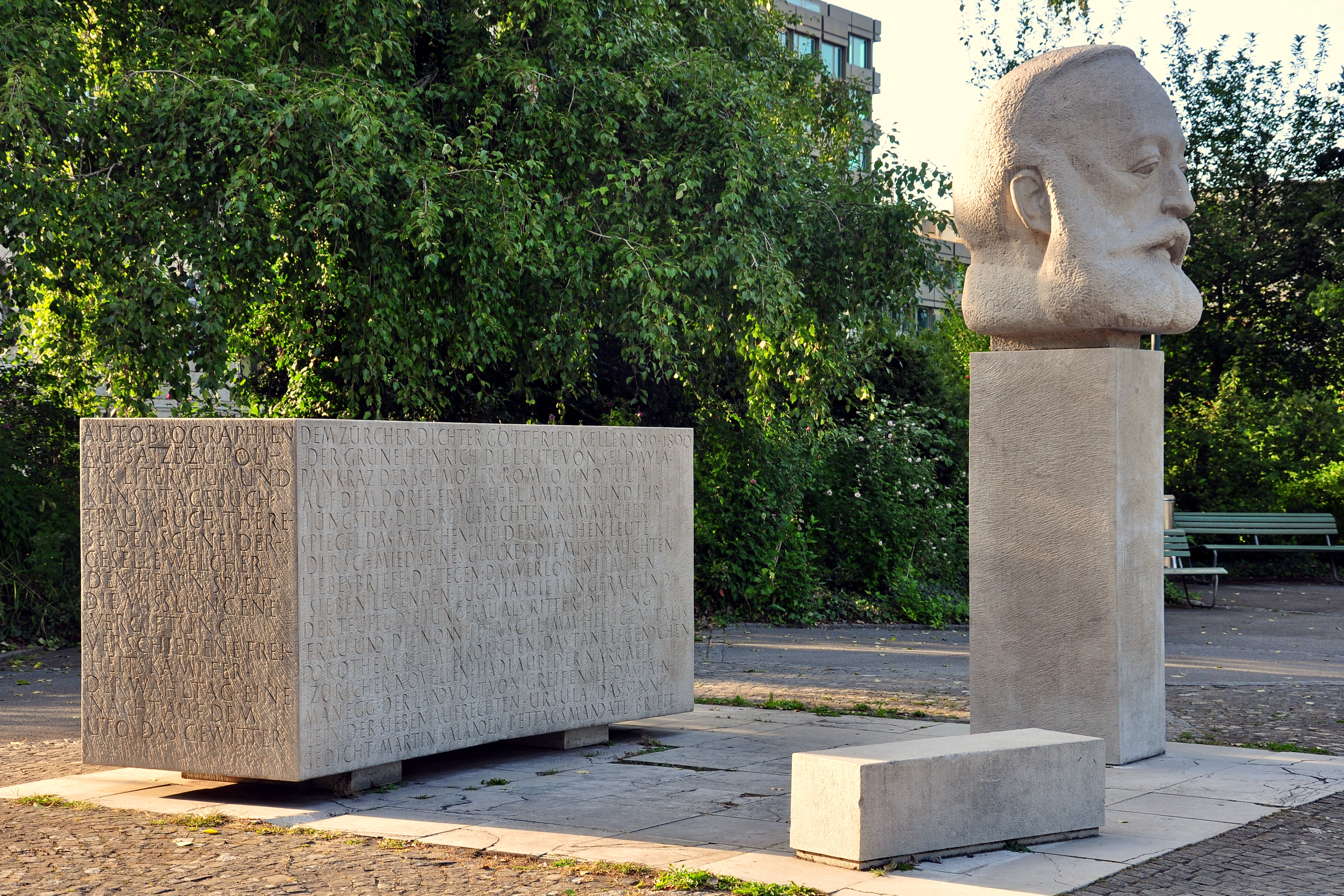
Gottfried Keller memorial at Enge harbour

Enge (Swiss Standard German pronunciation: [ˈɛŋɛ]) is a quarter in District 2 of Zürich, Switzerland.

== History ==
Enge was incorporated into Zürich in 1893, along with 11 other formerly independent municipalities. In 2011, the population was 8,597. Enge, which is only 2.4 km^{2}, is the smallest neighbourhood in district 2.

== Transportation ==
Zürich Enge railway station is a stop of Zürich S-Bahn on the lines S2, S8, S21 and S24.

== Cultural heritage ==
Enge is located in prehistoric swampland on small islands around Sechseläutenplatz and peninsulas in Zürich. It is situated between the Limmat and Lake Zurich. Prehistoric pile dwellings around Lake Zurich were set on piles in order to protect against the occasional flooding of the rivers Linth and Jona. Zürich–Enge Alpenquai, a locality of the municipality of Zürich, is located on the shore of Lake Zurich in Enge. It was bordered by the settlements at Kleiner Hafner and Grosser Hafner on a peninsula island in the effluence of the Limmat, within an area of about 0.2 square kilometres (49.42 acres) in Zürich. It is one of 56 Swiss sites of the UNESCO World Heritage Site Prehistoric pile dwellings around the Alps, the settlement is also listed in the Swiss inventory of cultural property of national and regional significance as a Class object, as well as the Arboretum including the Voliere Zürich, as part of the so-called Quaianlagen.

The Synagoge Zürich Löwenstrasse is also listed as a Class B object of regional importance, The library of the Israelitische Cultusgemeinde Zürich (ICZ) in Zürich-Enge at the Arboretum Zürich is listed as a Class A object of national importance.

== Notable people ==
- Lydia Welti-Escher (1858–1891), patron of the arts and founder of the Gottfried Keller Stiftung
- Gottfried Keller (1819–1890), Swiss poet
