= Kleiner Hafner =

Prehistoric pile dwelling in Switzerland

Coordinates: 47°21′58.19″N 8°32′38.66″E

Kleiner Hafner is one of the 111 serial sites of the UNESCO World Heritage Site Prehistoric pile dwellings around the Alps, of which are 56 located in Switzerland.

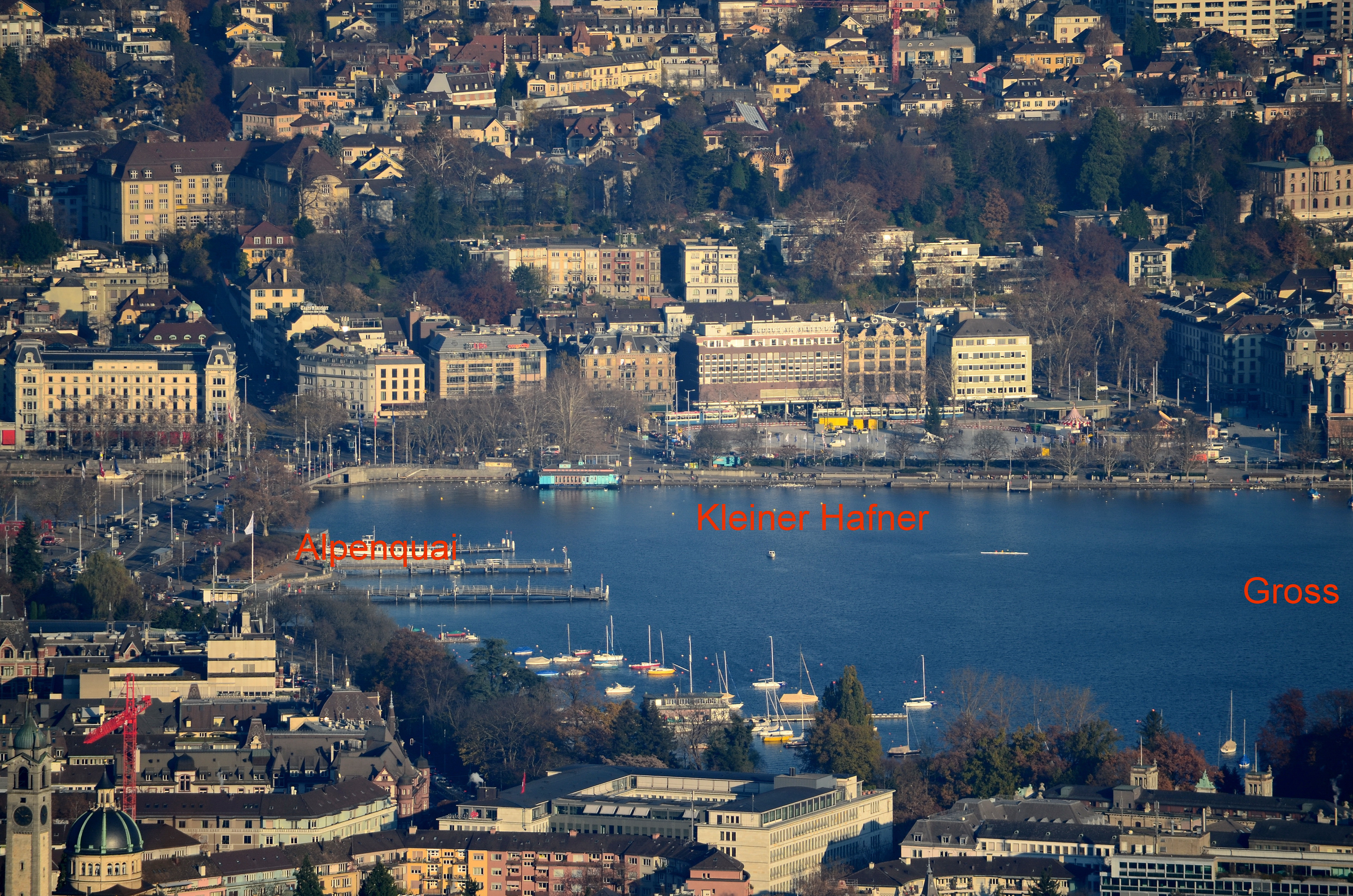
The site of the prehistoric settlement

== Geography ==
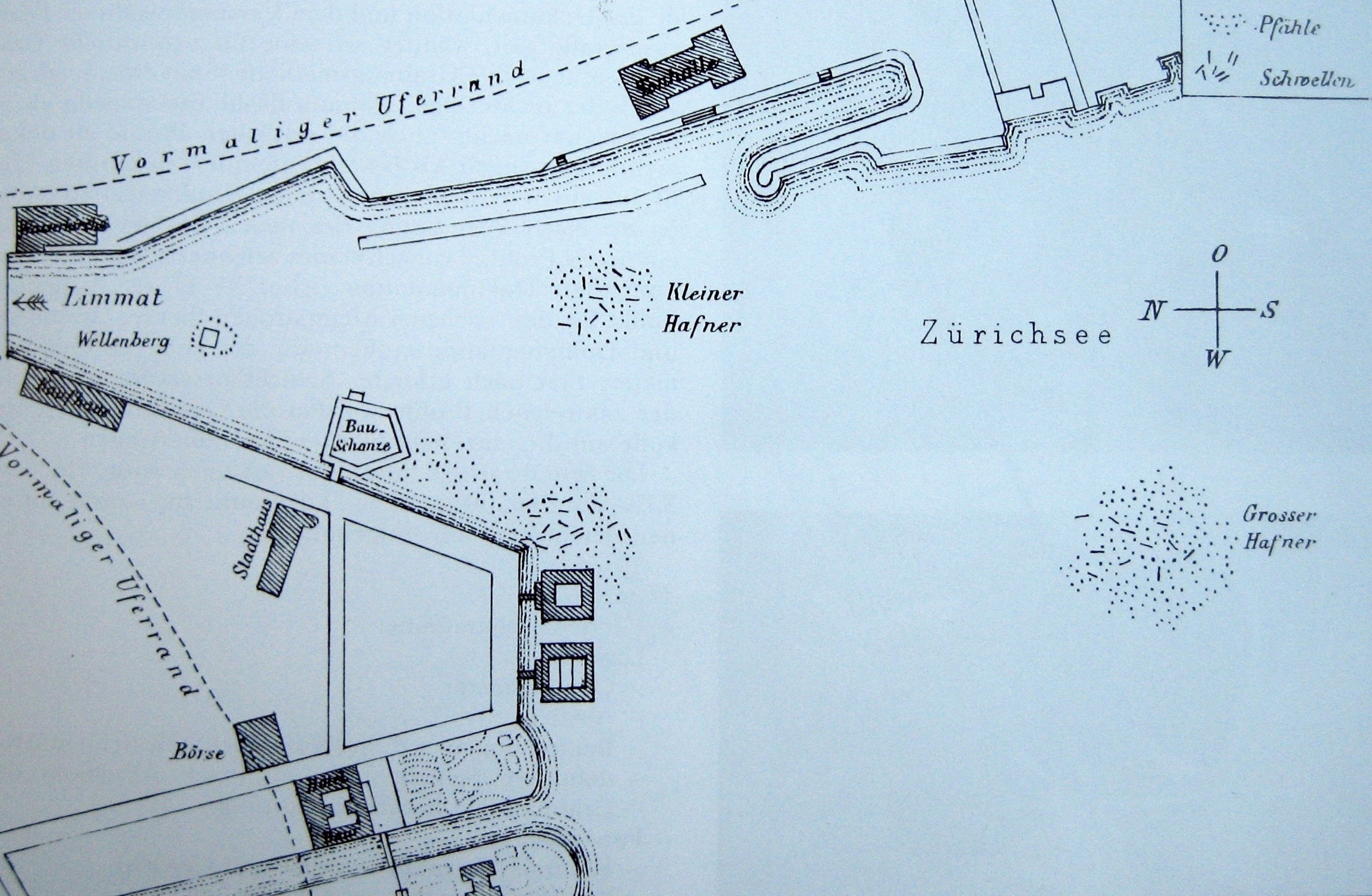
Plan by Ferdinand Keller

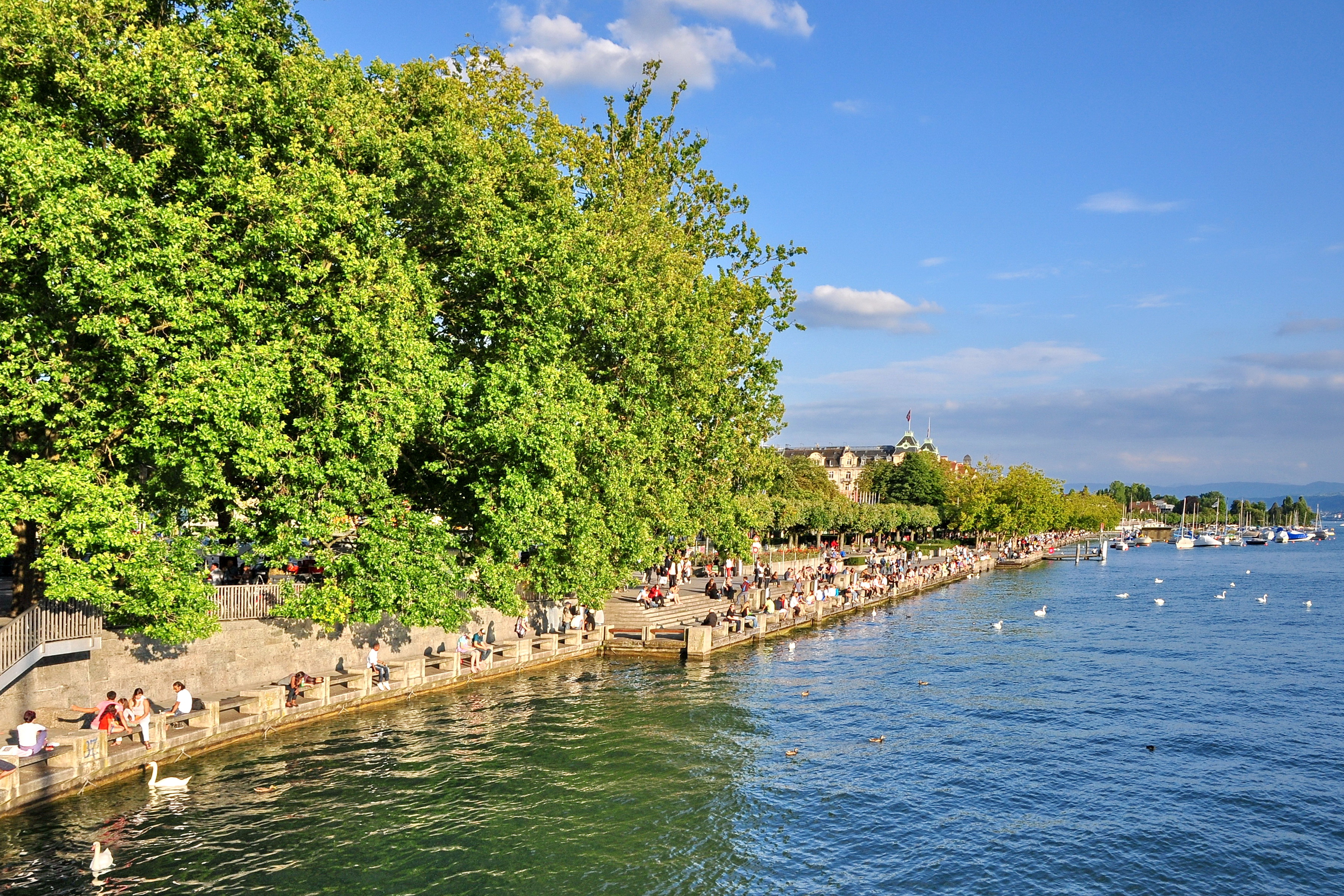
The former site at the as of today Utoquai

Kleiner Hafner was located on the then swamp land between the river Limmat and Zürichsee around Sechseläutzenplatz on a small peninsula in Zürich, and as well as the other Prehistoric pile dwellings around Zürichsee set on piles to protect against occasional flooding by the rivers Linth and Jona. The settlement is located on Zürichsee lakeshore in Enge, a locality of the municipality of Zürich. It was neighbored by the settlements Zürich–Enge Alpenquai and Grosser Hafner on a then island in the effluence of the Limmat, within an area of about 0.2 square kilometres (49.42 acres) in the city of Zürich. The site Kleiner Hafner comprises 0.64 hectares (1.58 acres), and the buffer zone including the lake area comprises 16.56 hectares (40.92 acres).

== History ==
The site is internationally known since 2009, when during the beginning of the construction of the underground parking facility at Sechseläutzenplatz the remains of Prehistoric pile dwellings around Zürichsee, in the immediate vicinity of the wetland soil settlement Kleiner Hafner in the lower basin of Zürichsee, were found. Instead of a rescue excavation, the construction works were suspended for nine months and the settlement remains were systematically archaeologically recorded; the results of the excavations are permanently shown in the pavillon to the lakeshore.

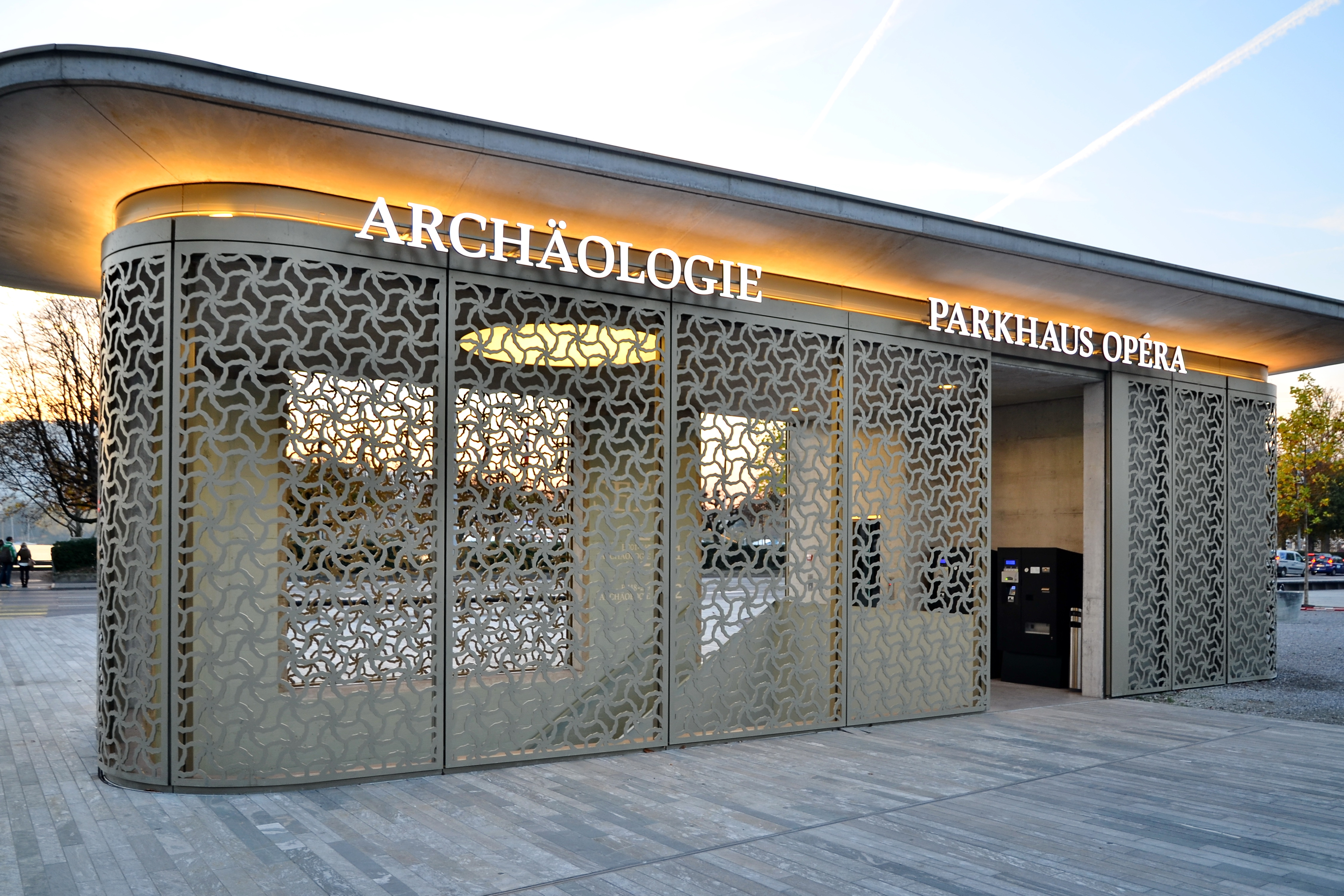
Entrance to the archaeological exhibition

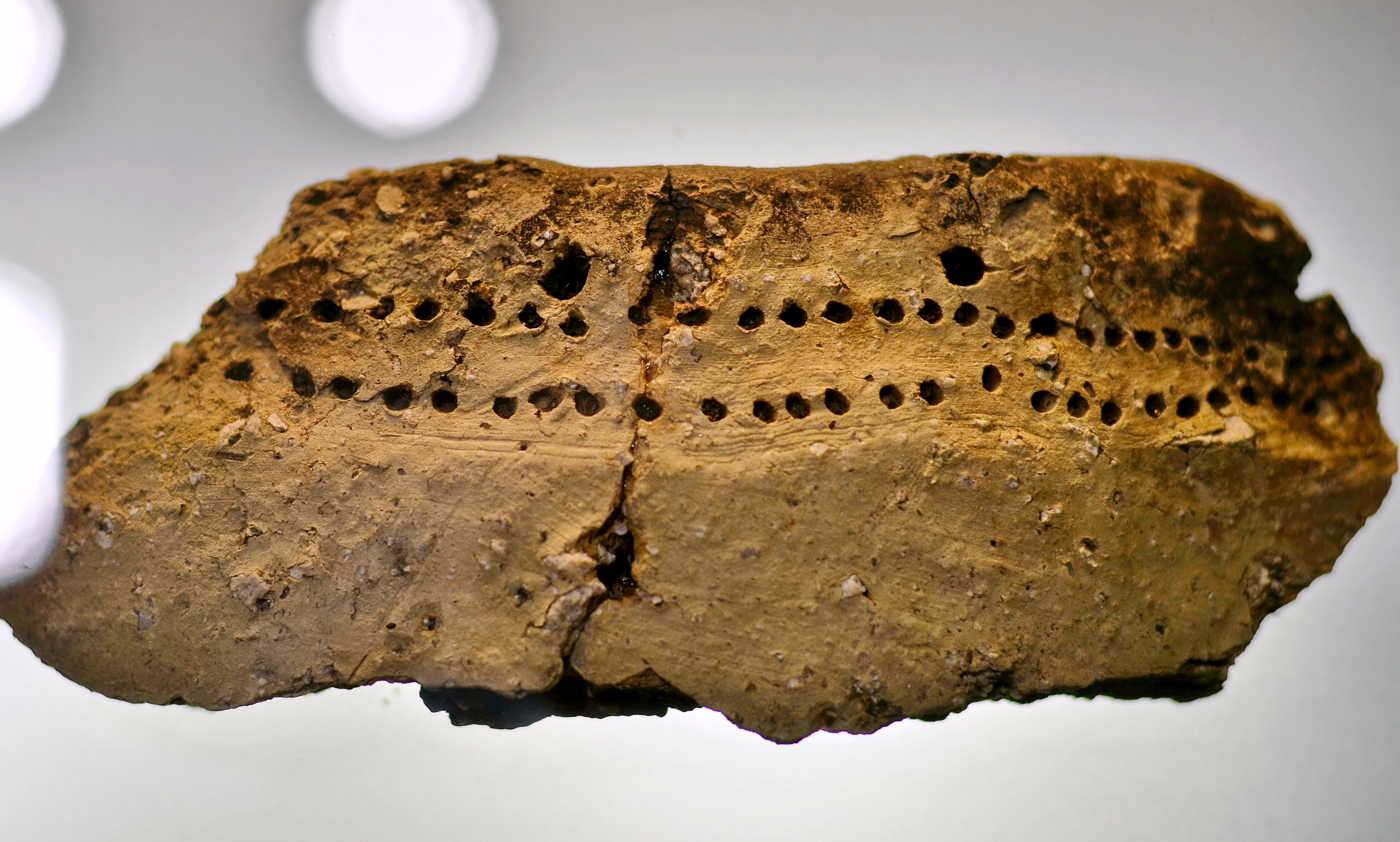
Horgen culture, fragment of ceramics

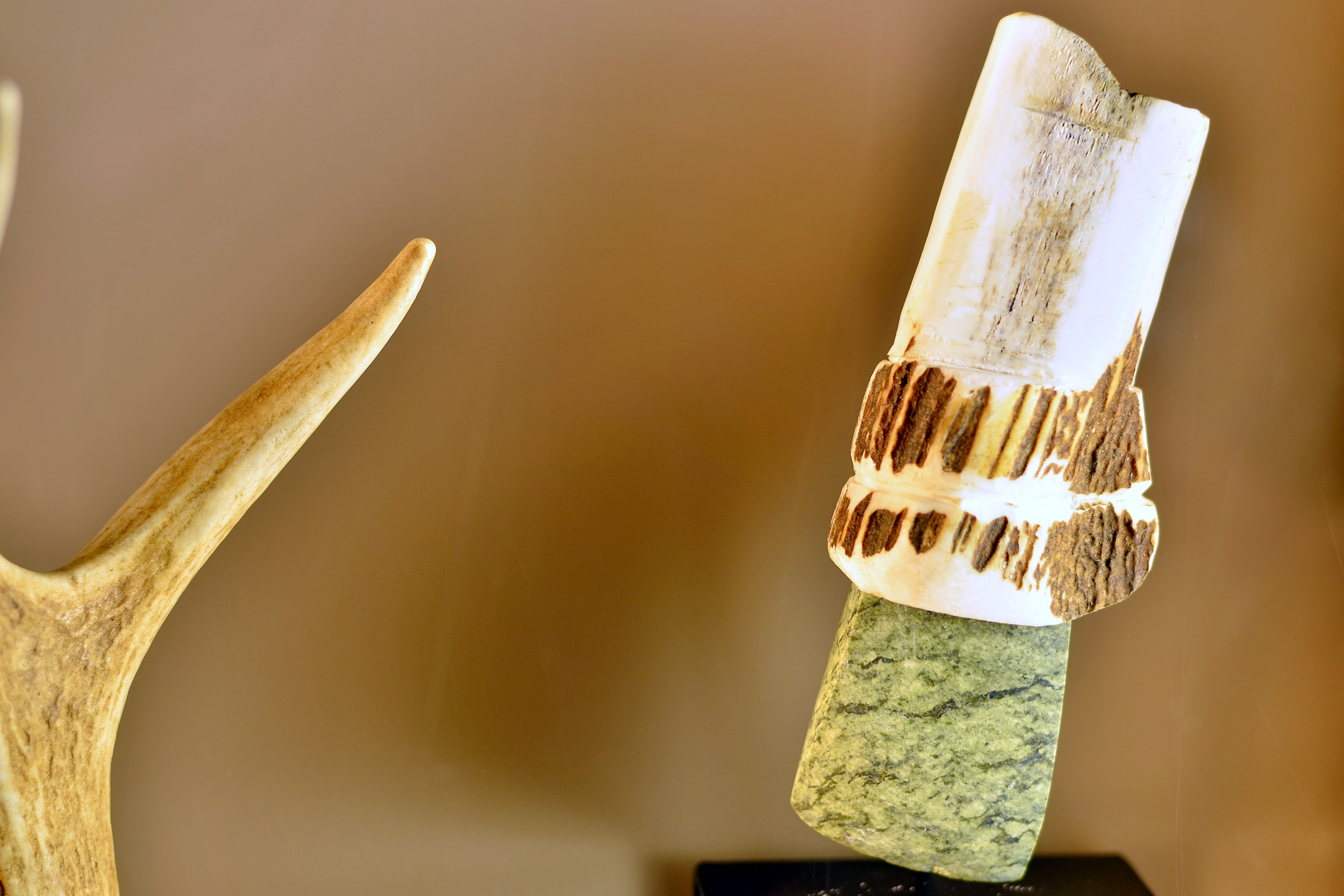
Horgen culture, fragment of a shafted stone axe

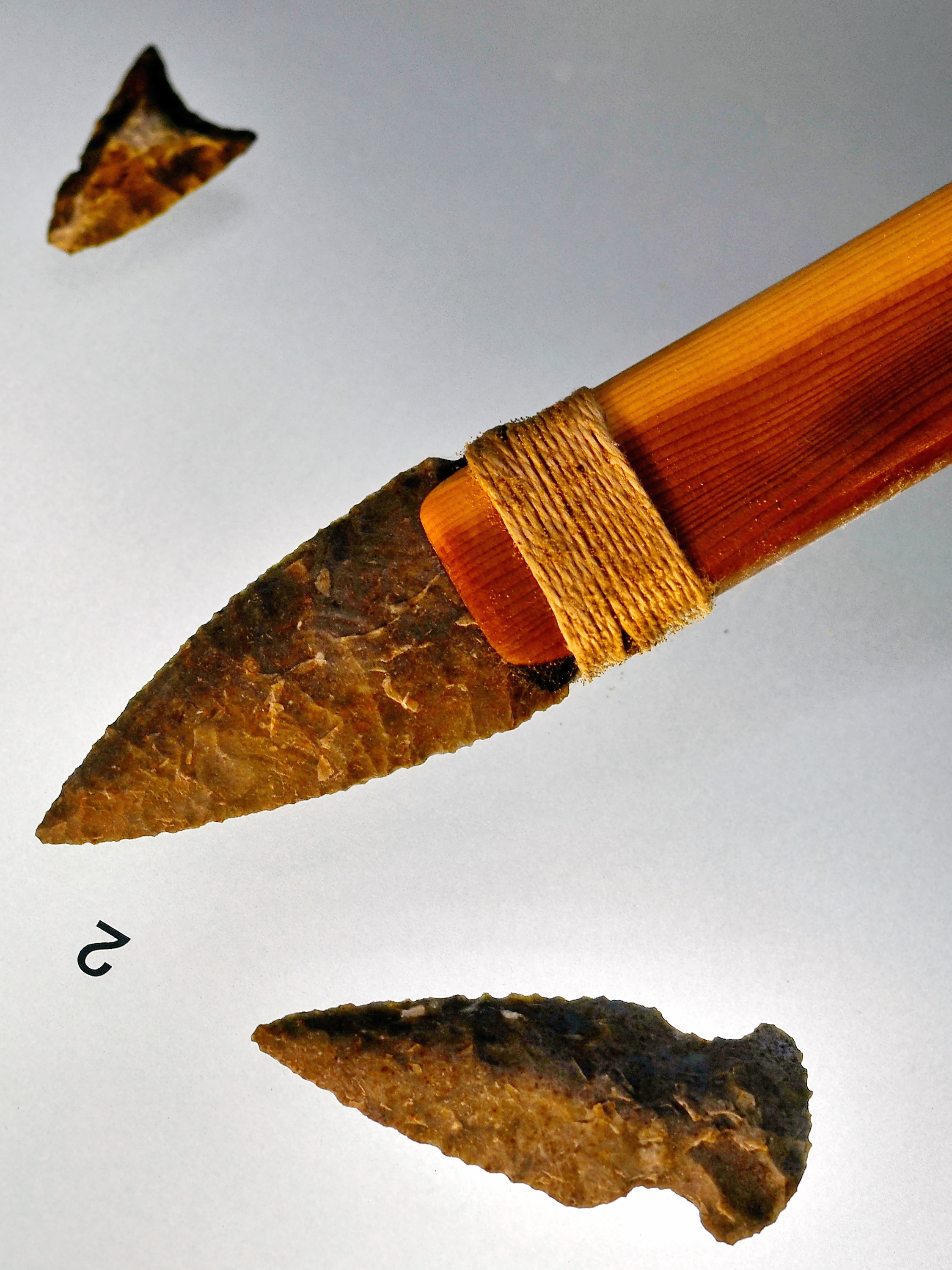
Horgen culture, silex knife and stone arrowheads

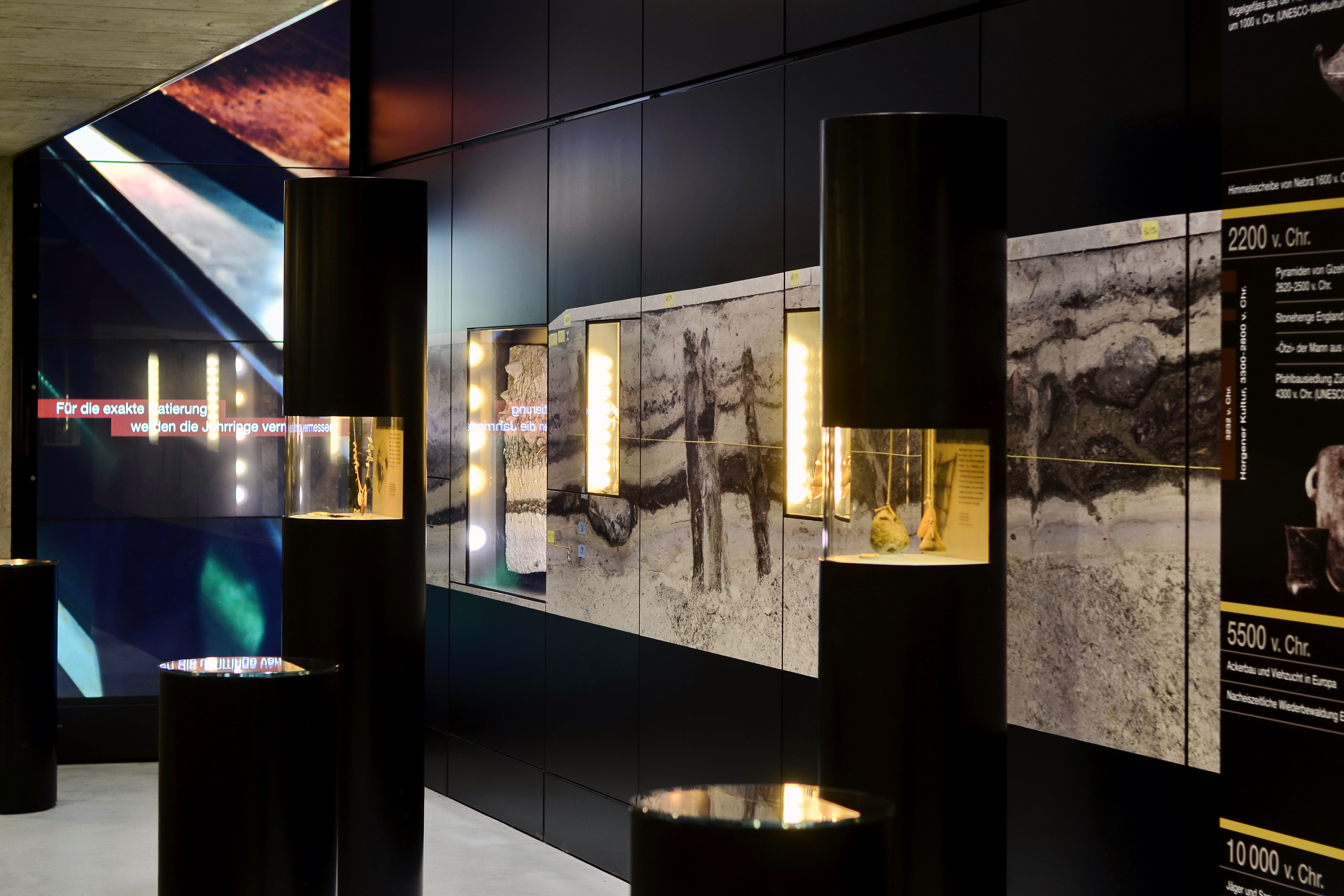
multimedia presentation at the lakeshore pavillon

== Description ==
Once a former island or peninsula at the estuary of Zürichsee lakeshore and the Limmat, the settlement Kleiner Hafner represents all periods of pile dwelling. There are finds from the Neolithic Egolzwil, Cortaillod and Horgen cultures forming an important reference assemblage which allows the study of cultural development during the late 5th and early 4th millennia BC.

== Finds ==
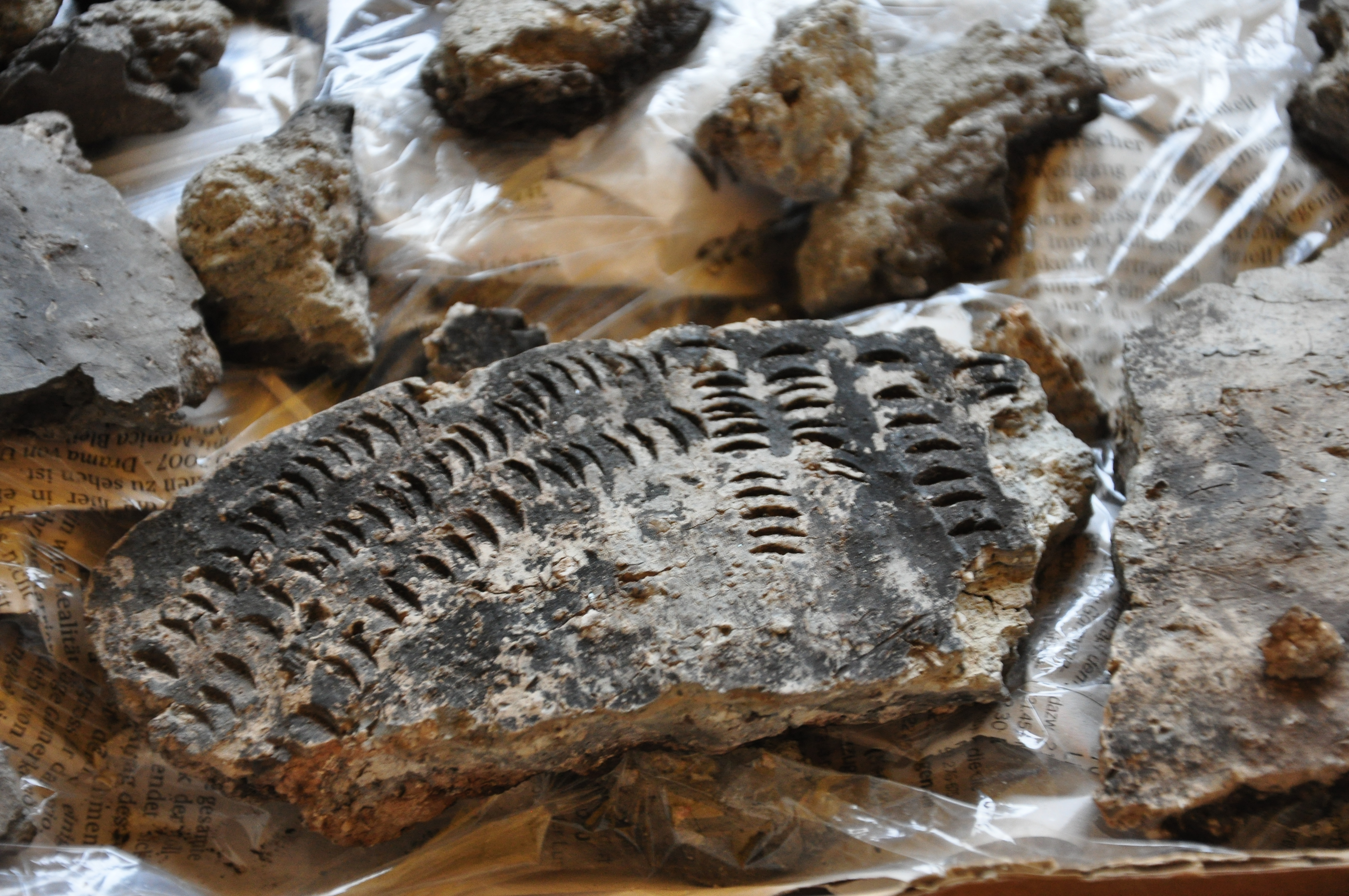
Ceramics of the Horgen culture

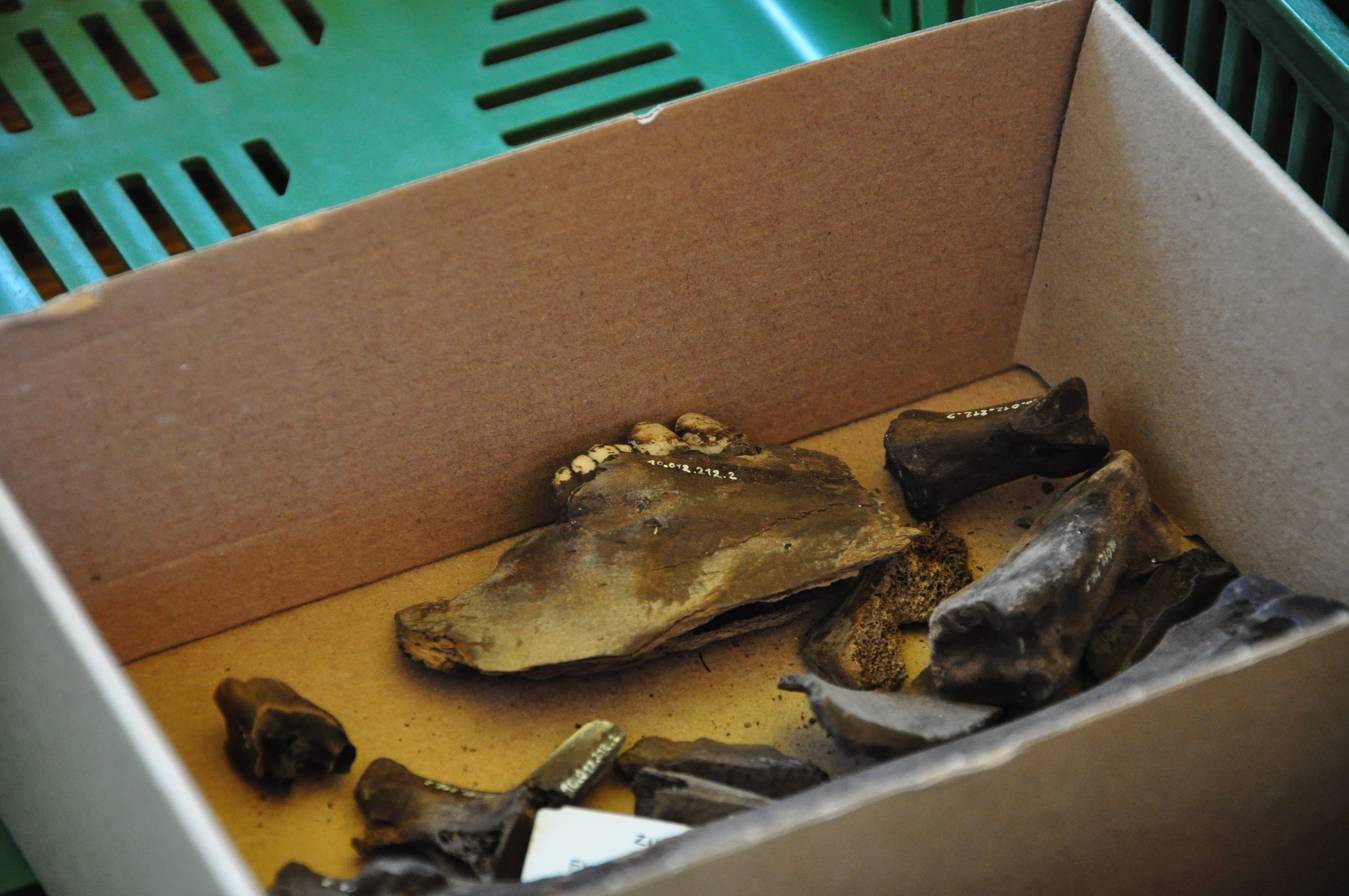
Animal bones of the "dining list" of the former inhabitants of Kleiner Hafner

Already in the late 1860s, various prehistoric settlements were discovered in connection with the construction of the lake quai assets, and Groffried Keller pointed to a variety of dwelling posts. Thenafter the findings were considered forgotten. Under the leadership of the former city archaeologist and pioneer of underwater archaeology, Dr. Ulrich Ruoff, the rediscovery of the prehistoric island settlement occurred on 24 December 1966. Diving excavations were executed from 1981 to 1984 to study the stratigraphy of the Neolithic settlement remains. In the two excavation campaigns, the diving team found the nearly complete furniture of the villagers: pottery cooking vessels and storage vessels, tools made of bone, antler and flint, stone axes, remnants of textiles and jewelry made of animal teeth or stone beads. In the later phase of the European Bronze Age settlement, there the divers found bronze axes, knives, fishing hooks and jewellery.

Furthermore, about 3,000 piles, anchoring and other timbers, hearths made of clay and parts of looms, were ensured. The houses were built on platforms, not in the lake, but at the ground level or elevated near the lake shore, which was probably repeatedly exposed to flooding. The lake and the Limmat probably also served as transportation way and as source of food. Agriculture, hunting and gathering economy also was verified. Thanks to the excellent preservation conditions in the wet environment, for the time between 4350 BC and 2400 BC, the scientist got further knowledge of the life and economy at that settlement, where the consolidation of the livestock fell in this period of time. The diet of the residents was surprisingly rich: wheat, barley, peas, poppy, wild apples, blackberries, raspberries, strawberries, hazelnuts and whitefish, perch, pike and catfish from the lake. Also found were bones of domestic animals, such as cattle, sheep, goats and pigs, as well as remains of wild animals, among them aurochs, deer, roe deer, wild boar, hare, horses and bears. Human skeletons were not found during the excavation, because they decomposed without burial sites. During renovation of the commercial building of the Swiss National Bank at Seefeldstrasse in 2011, the department of underwater archaeology recovered shards of pottery vessels, stone and bone tools, a pendant made of antlers and animal bones, as well as some piles of the stilt houses, that dendrochronology dated to 3684 BC.

== Protection ==
As well as being part of the 56 Swiss sites of the UNESCO World Heritage Site Prehistoric pile dwellings around the Alps, the settlement is also listed in the Swiss inventory of cultural property of national and regional significance as a Class A object of national importance. Hence, the area is provided as a historical site under federal protection, within the meaning of the Swiss Federal Act on the nature and cultural heritage (German: Bundesgesetz über den Natur- und Heimatschutz NHG) of 1 July 1966. Unauthorised researching and purposeful gathering of findings represent a criminal offense according to Art. 24.

== See also ==
- Grosser Hafner
- Prehistoric pile dwellings around Zürichsee

== Literature ==
- Peter J. Suter, Helmut Schlichtherle et al.: Pfahlbauten – Palafittes – Palafitte. Palafittes, Biel 2009. ISBN 978-3-906140-84-1.
- Beat Eberschweiler: Ur- und frühgeschichtliche Verkehrswege über den Zürichsee: Erste Ergebnisse aus den Taucharchäologischen Untersuchungen beim Seedamm. In: Mitteilungen des Historischen Vereins des Kantons Schwyz, Volume 96, Schwyz 2004.
