= Bürkliplatz, Zurich =

Public square in Zürich, Switzerland

Bürkliplatz
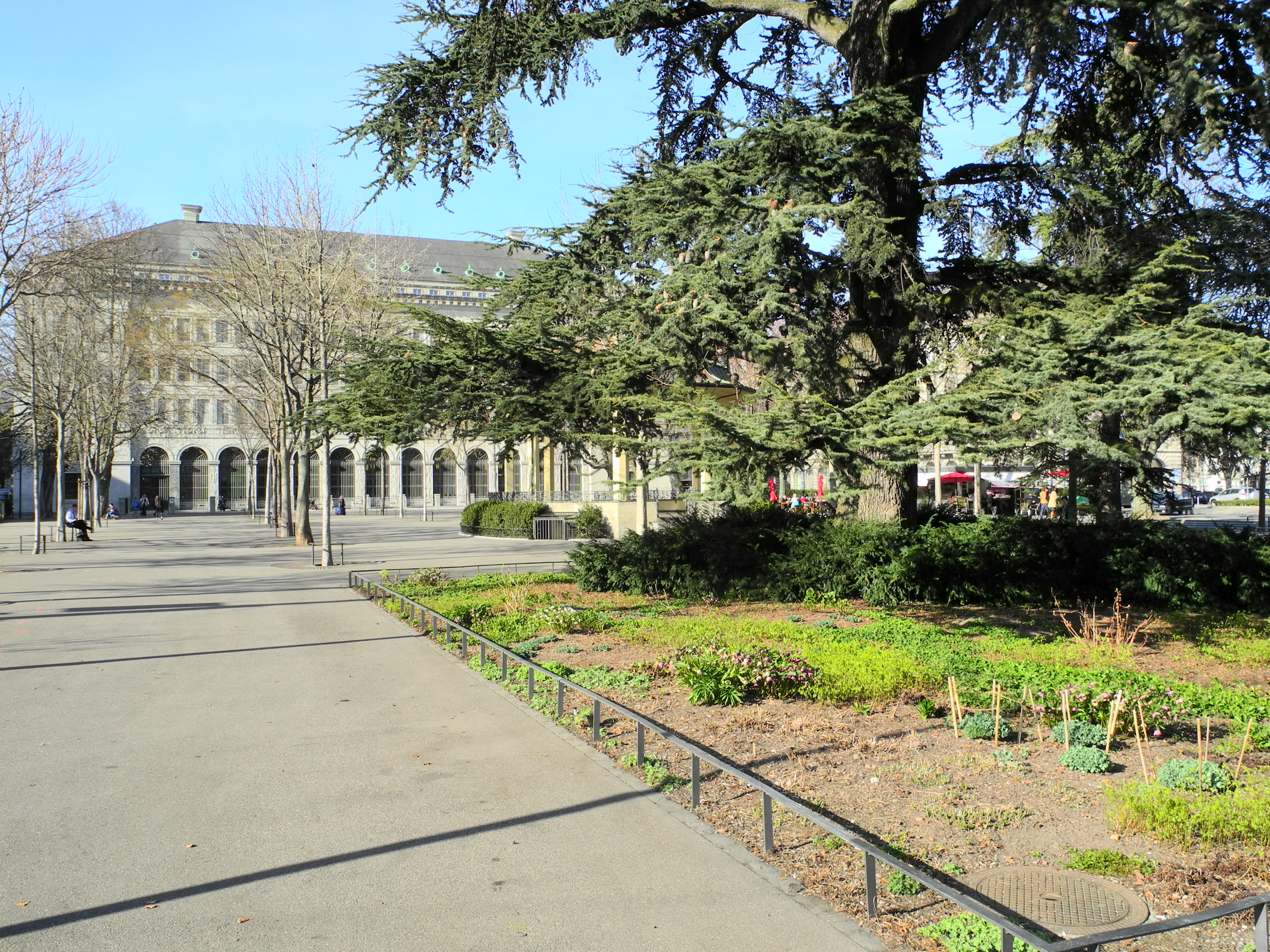
- Stadthausanlage next to the Bürkliplatz
- Interactive map of Bürkliplatz
- Native name: Bürkliplatz, Stadthausanlage (German)
- Owner: City of Zurich
- Addresses: Bürkliplatz
- Location: Zurich, Switzerland
- Postal code: 8001
- Coordinates: 47°22′01″N 8°32′27″E

Construction
- Construction start: 1881
- Completed: 1887
- Inauguration: 1887

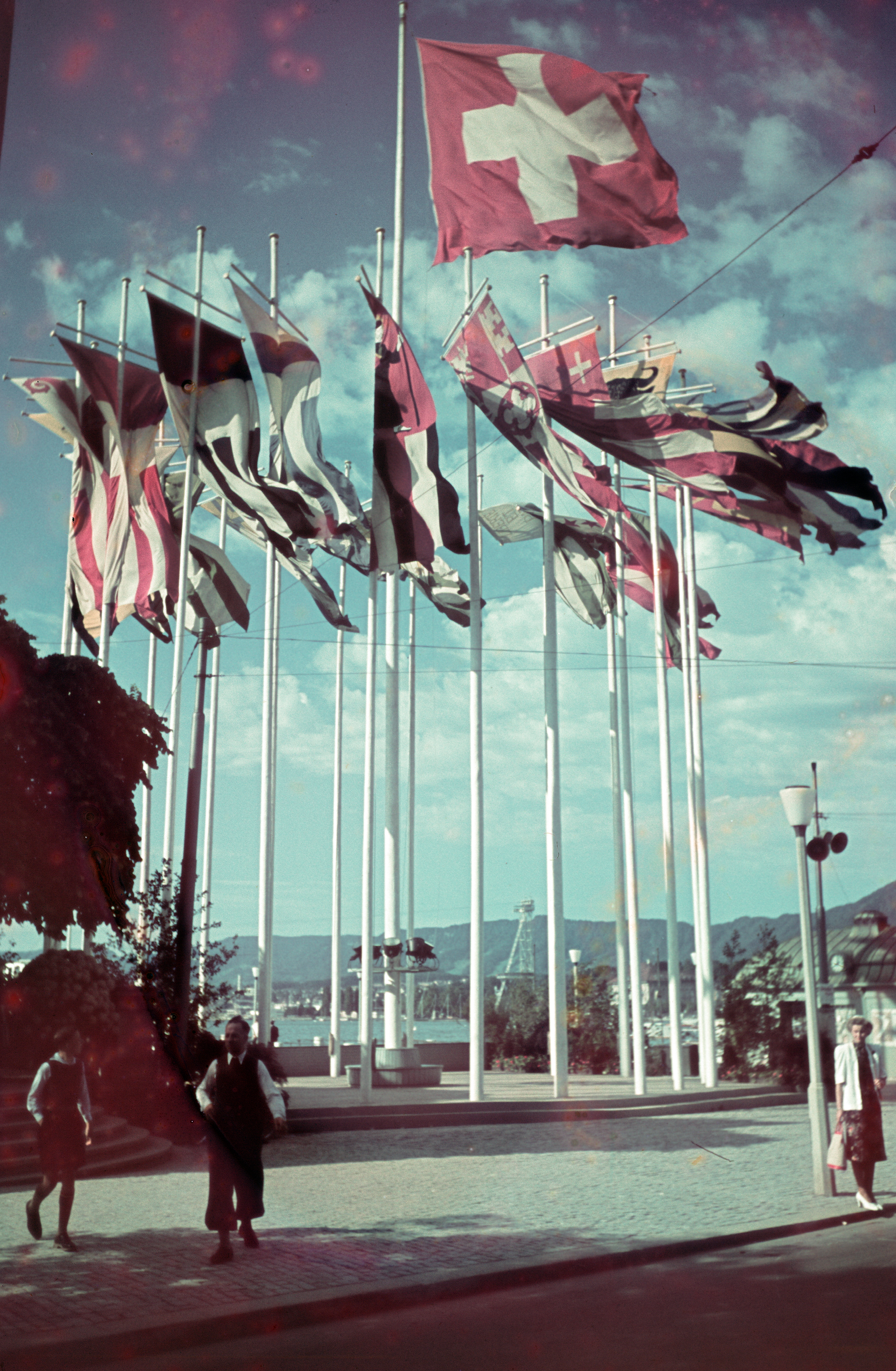
Swiss flag during the Swiss national exposition "Landi", Bürkliplatz in Zurich, 1939

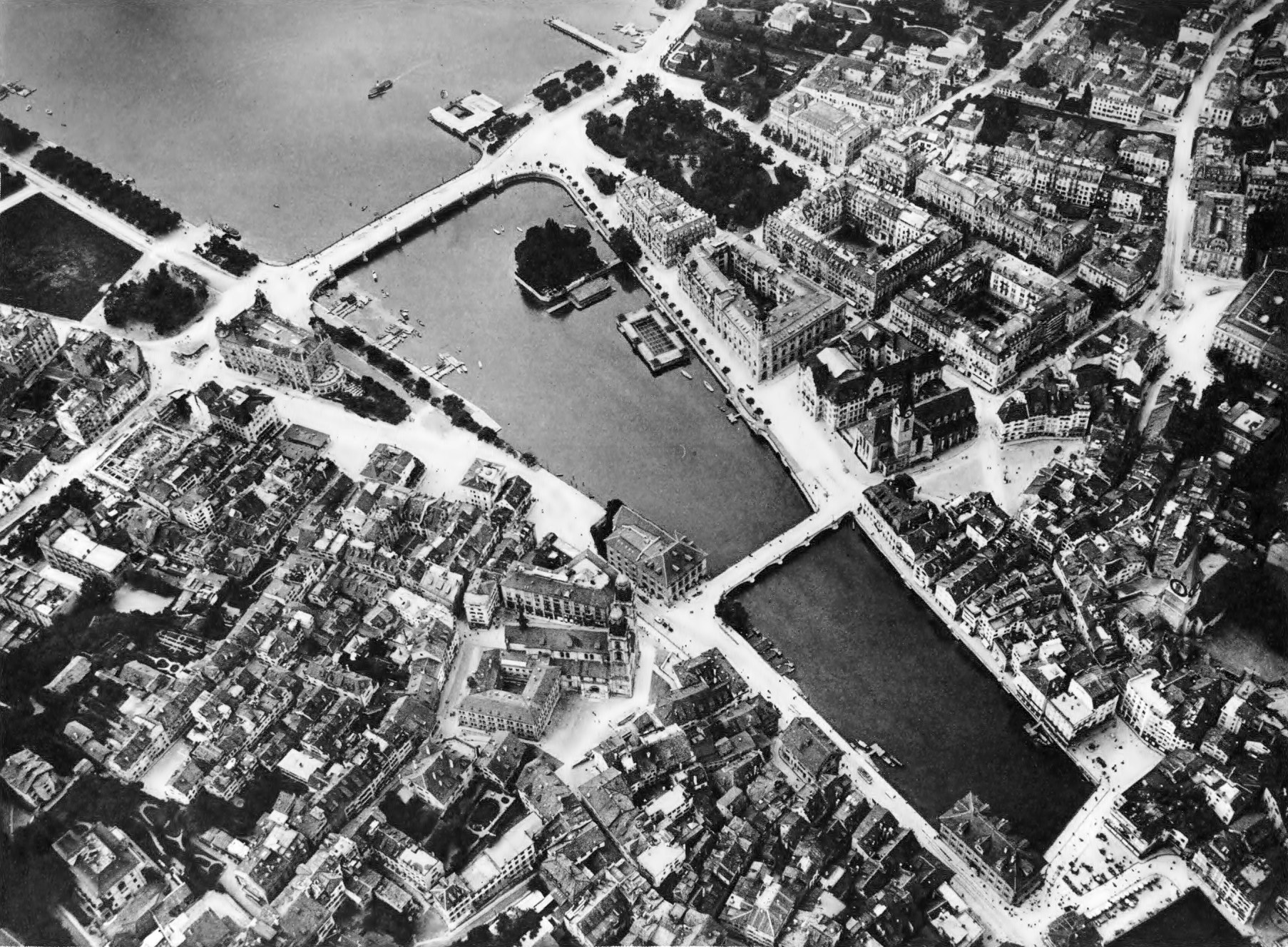
Limmatquai and Quaianlagen in Zurich: Bellevueplatz and Bürkliplatz, Quaibrücke, Münsterbrücke and Münsterhof, and Rathausbrücke–Weinplatz, aerial photography by Eduard Spelterini in the probably mid-1890s.

Bürkliplatz is a town square in Zurich, Switzerland. It is named after Arnold Bürkli, and is one of nodal points of the road and public transportation, and of the lake shore promenades that were built between 1881 and 1887. The tree-shaded square between Bahnhofstrasse and Fraumünsterstrasse is called Stadthausanlage.

== Geography ==
Bürkliplatz is situated in the historic Alpenquai area near Lake Zurich. It is immediately to the west of the Quaibrücke (Quay Bridge) which crosses the river Limmat at the outflow of the lake known as the lake shore promenades or Quaianlagen. The Bürkliplatz is the only square between the General-Guisan-Quai and the Quaibrücke with a tram stop of the same name. The tree-shaded square between the Bahnhofstrasse on the west and the Fraumünsterstrasse on the east and the Bürklilatz in the south is called Stadthausanlage (City Hall Enclosure).

== Transportation ==
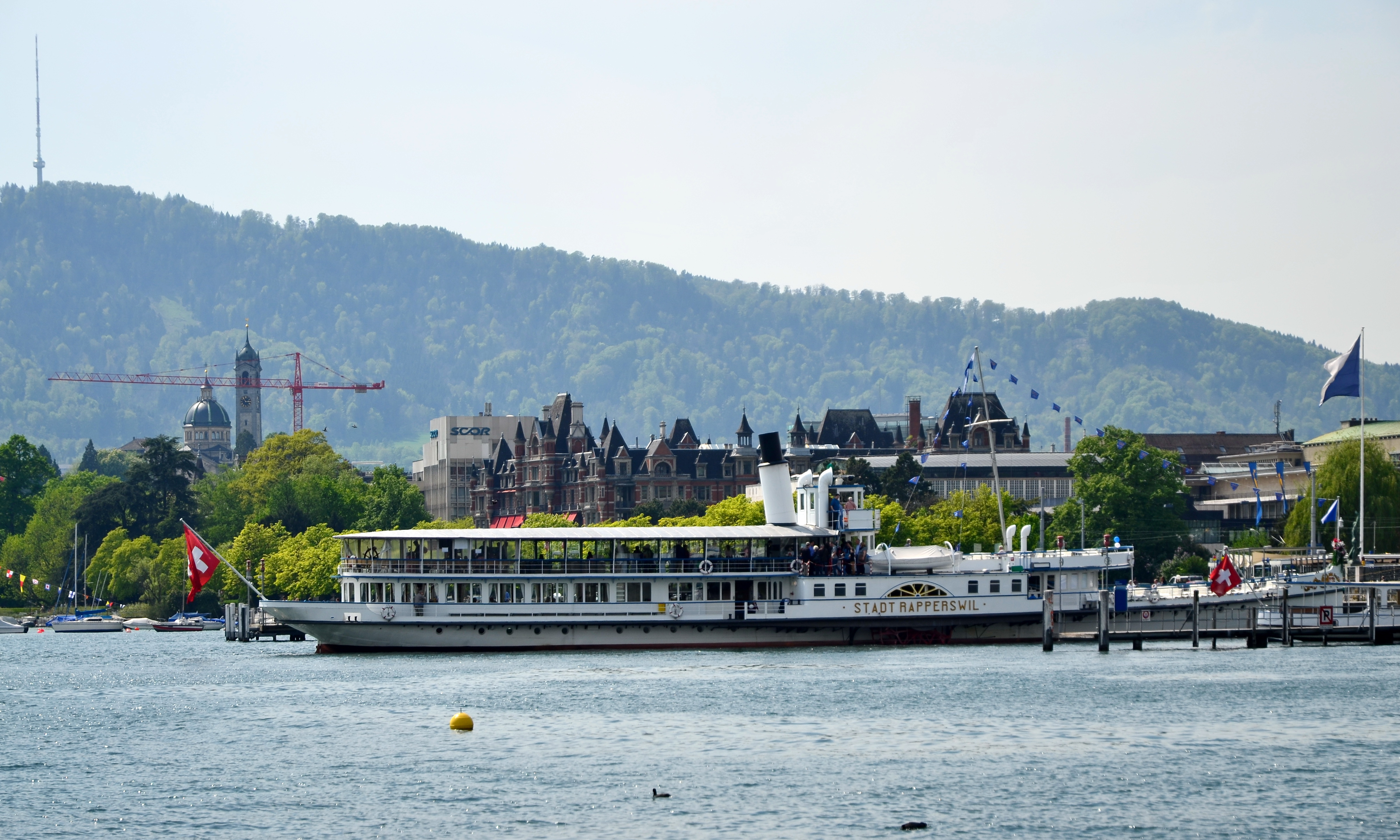
Bürkliplatz landing gate towards General-Guisan-Quai, Dampfschiff Stadt Rapperswil on occasion of one of its centennial roundtrips

The square is one of the nodal points of the Zurich tram system, with lines 2, 5, 8, 9 and 11 passing through it, as well as regional bus lines 161 and 165, on the boundary between Lindenhof and Enge quarters. The Zürichsee-Schifffahrtsgesellschaft (ZSG; Lake Zurich shipping company) has the terminus of its route to Rapperswil/Schmerikon here, and there is also a stop for the Limmat tour boats towards Zürichhorn.

== Points of interest ==
In addition to the Seeuferanlage (lakeshore park) and the neighbouring Uto and General Guisan quays, there is nearby the Arboretum Zürich which houses Voliere, an aviary and veterinary hospital, and the so-called Vogelpflegestation, a sanctuary for birds.

Among other points of interest is the floral clock at the outflow of the Schanzengraben moat, a corner where waterfowl look for food at the east of the Bürkliterrasse, and the Geiser monumental fountain.

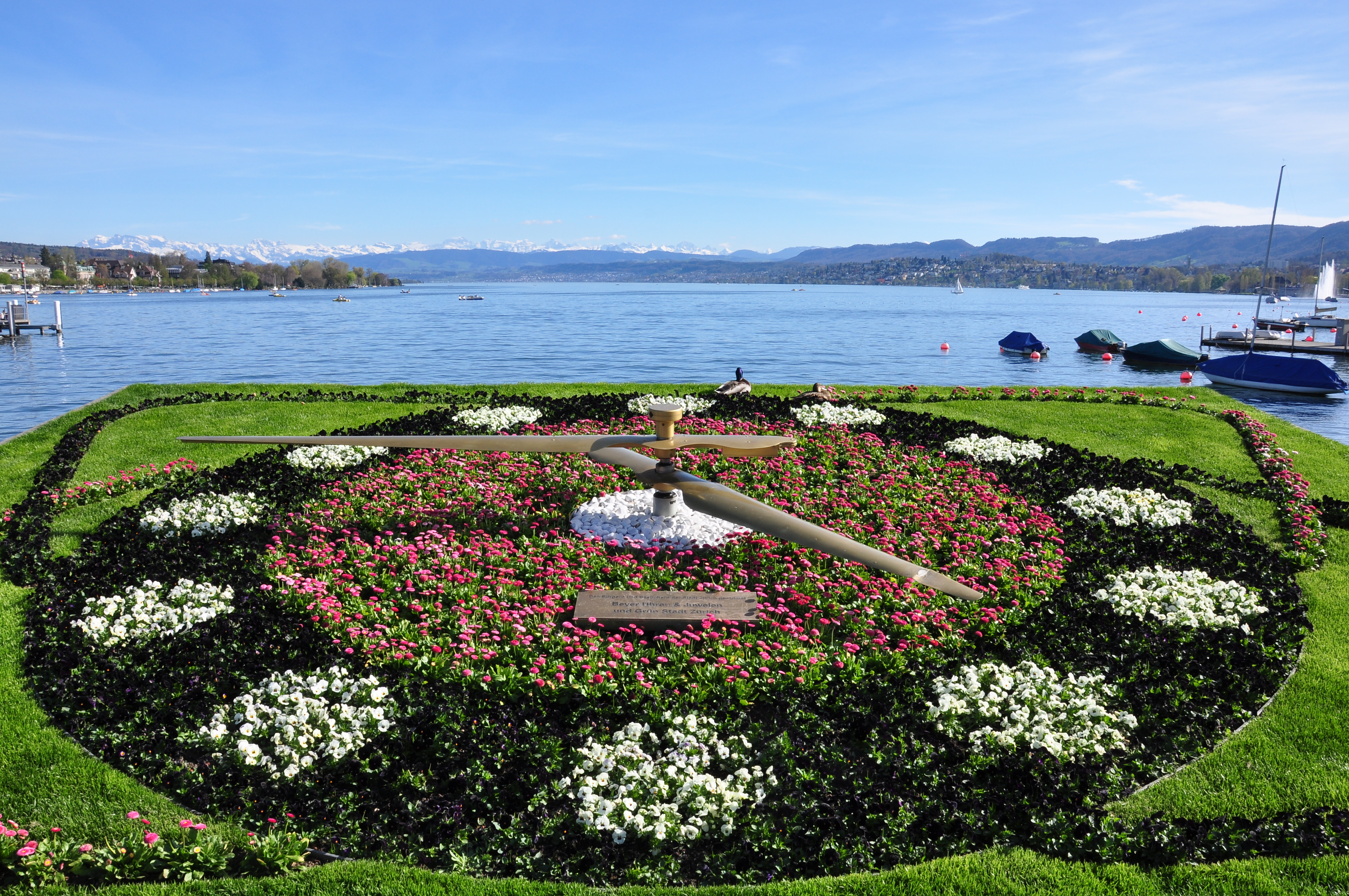
Floral clock

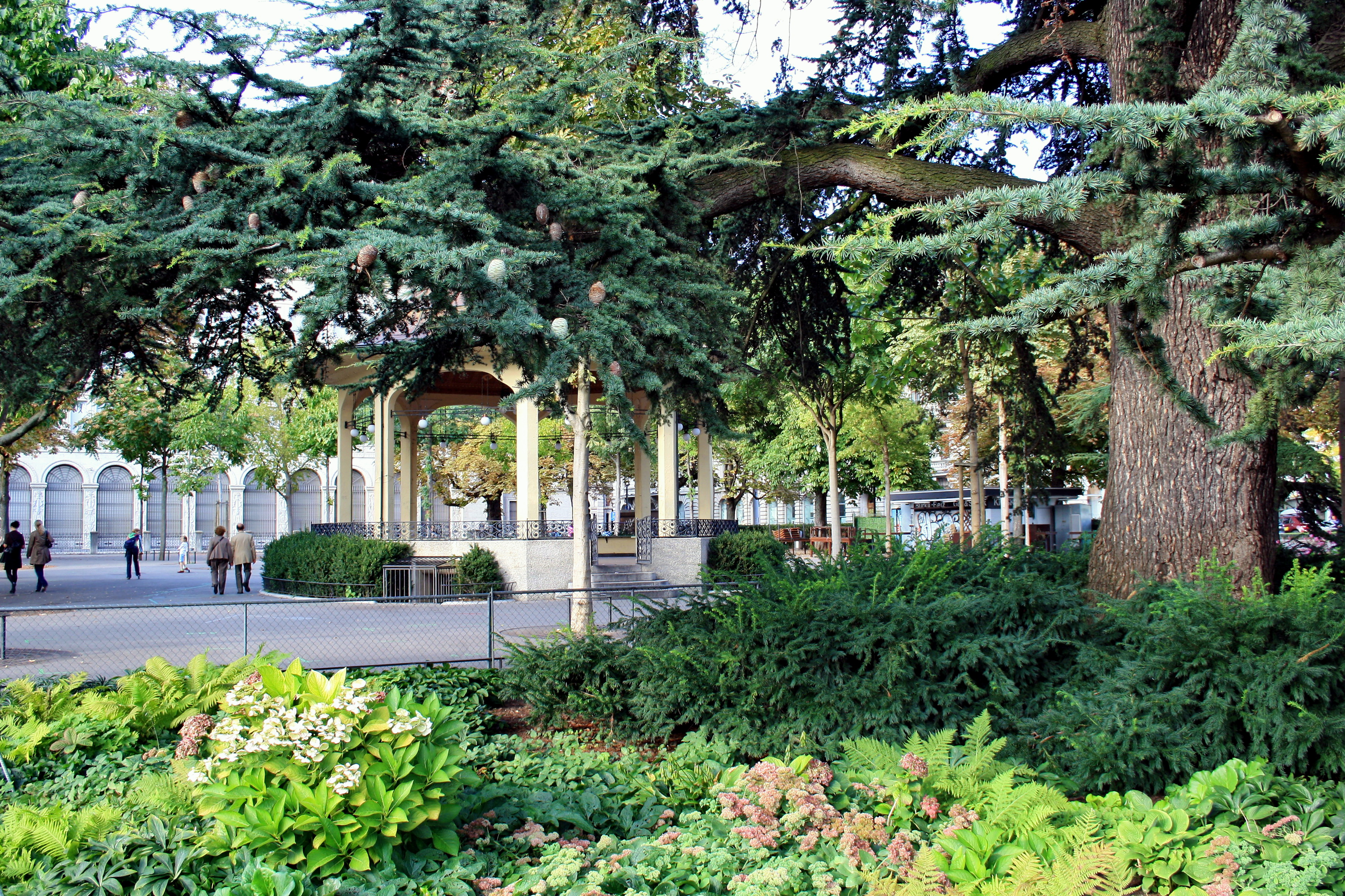
Cedrus libani

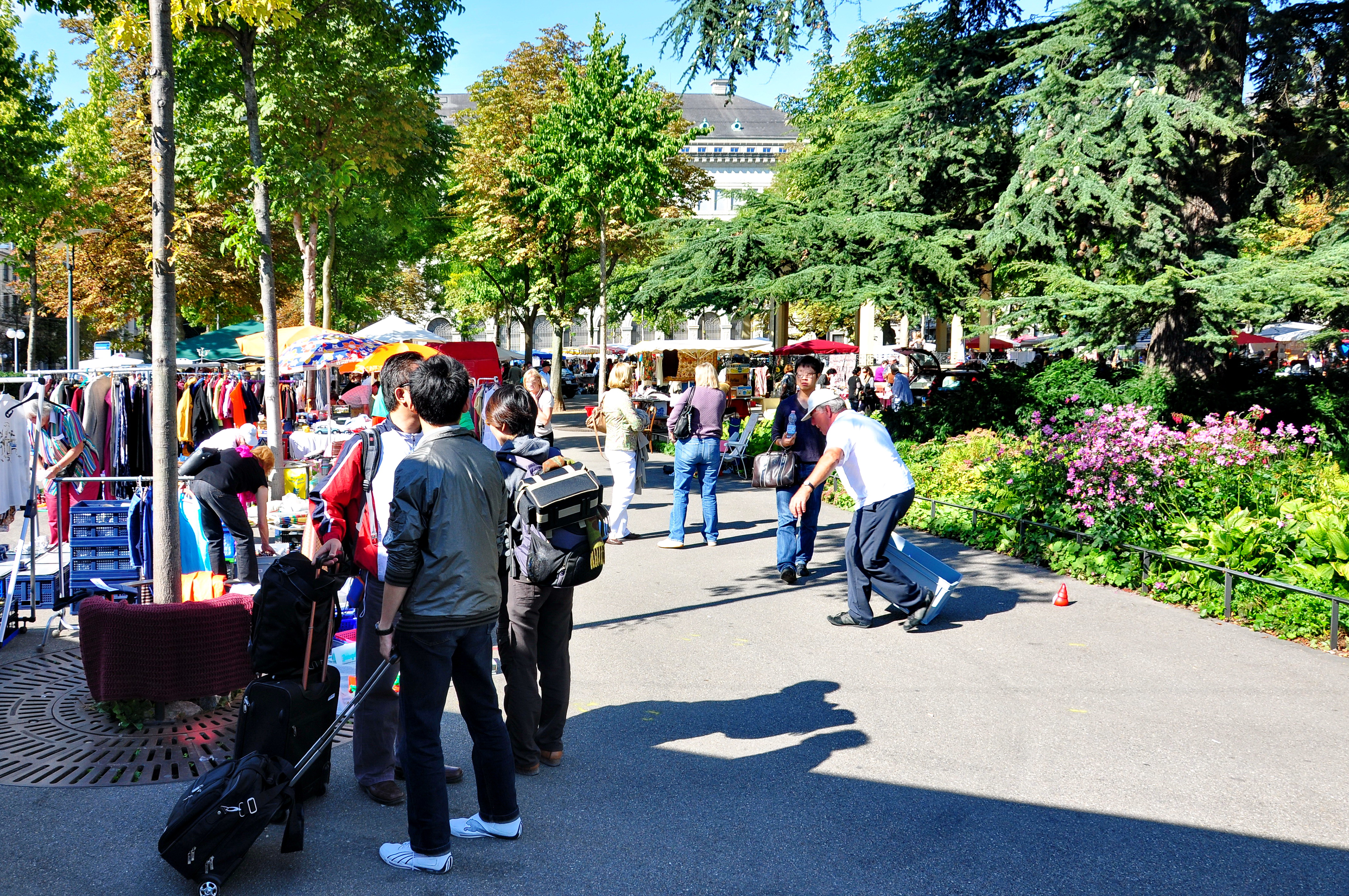
Flea market

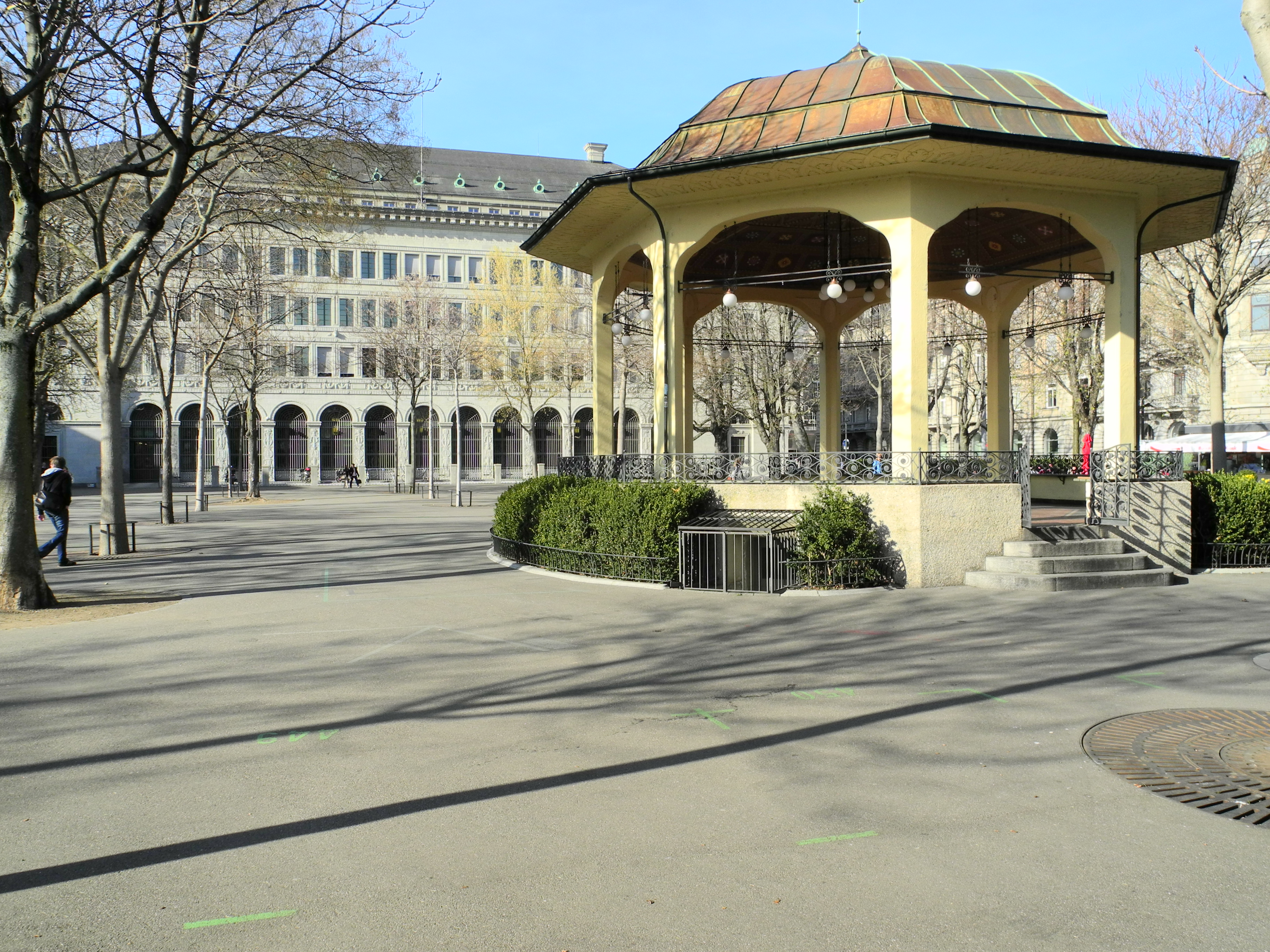
Musikpavillon and SNB building

On Fridays, one of the best-known markets is held there, and on Saturdays, a flea market (Flohmärt). There is also a kiosk and the historical Music Pavillon, where public concerts are still sometimes held, and the Swiss National Bank building, and the Bauschänzli at the Stadthausquai.

== Geiserbrunnen ==
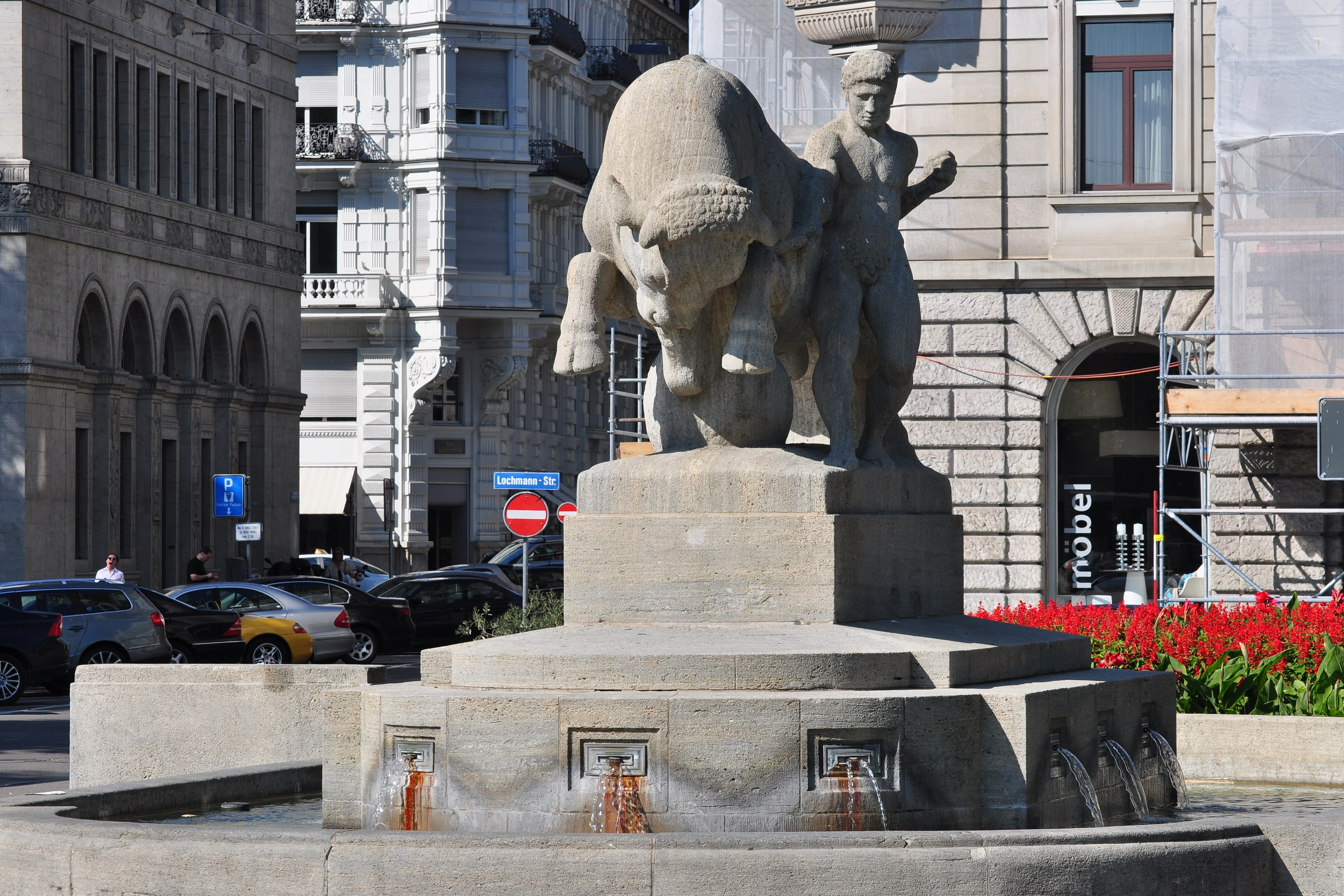
Geiserbrunnen

The monumental fountain bears the name of the former city architect, Arnold Geiser (1844-1909), whose legacy of 40,000 Swiss francs financed the erection of a "monumental fountain to beautify the city". On the occasion of an art competition held by the city government, Jakob Brüllmann sculpted the war memorial-like Stierbändiger Brunnen, better known as Geiserbrunnen which was inaugurated on 20 October 1911.

== Bürkliterrasse ==
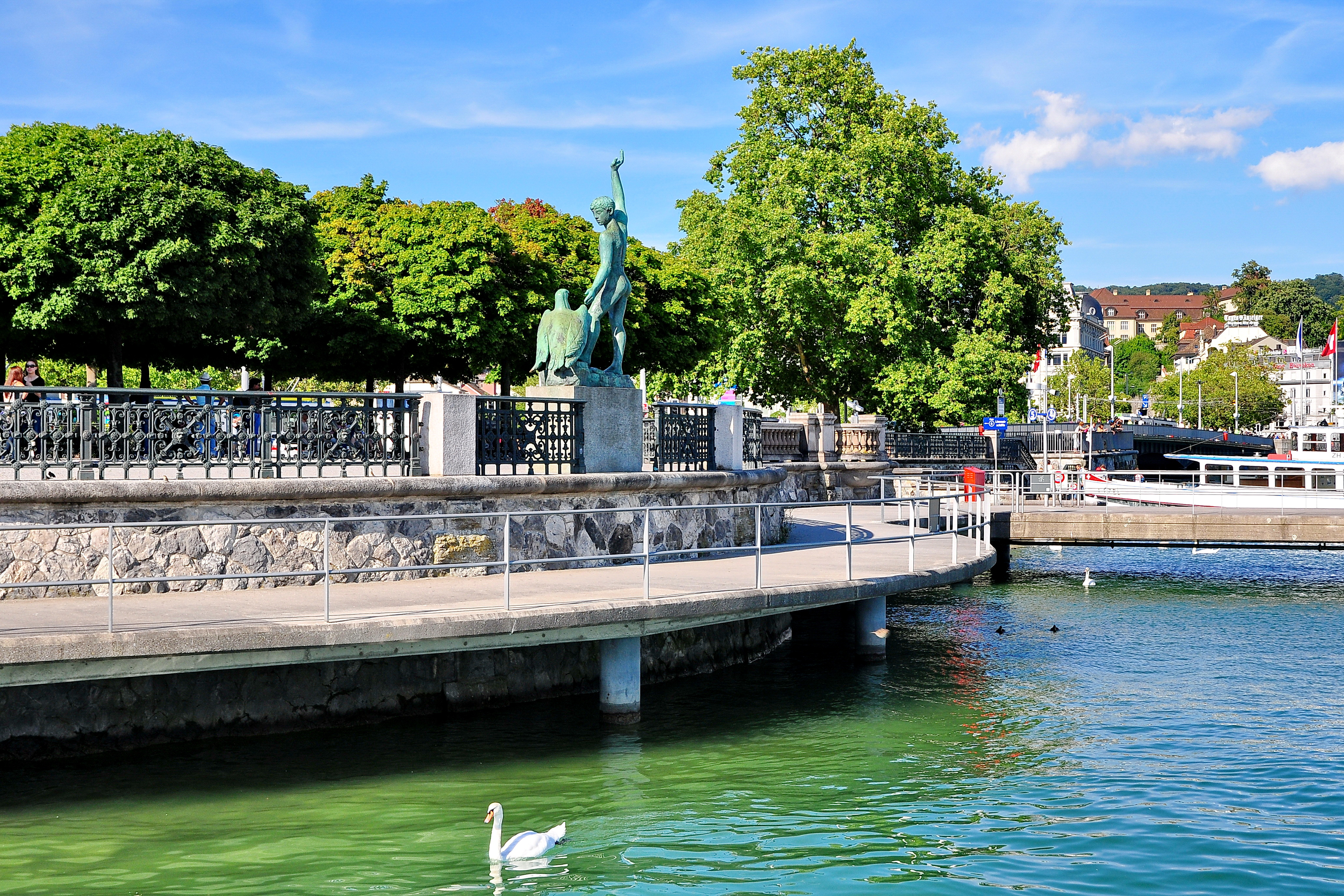
Bürkliterrasse

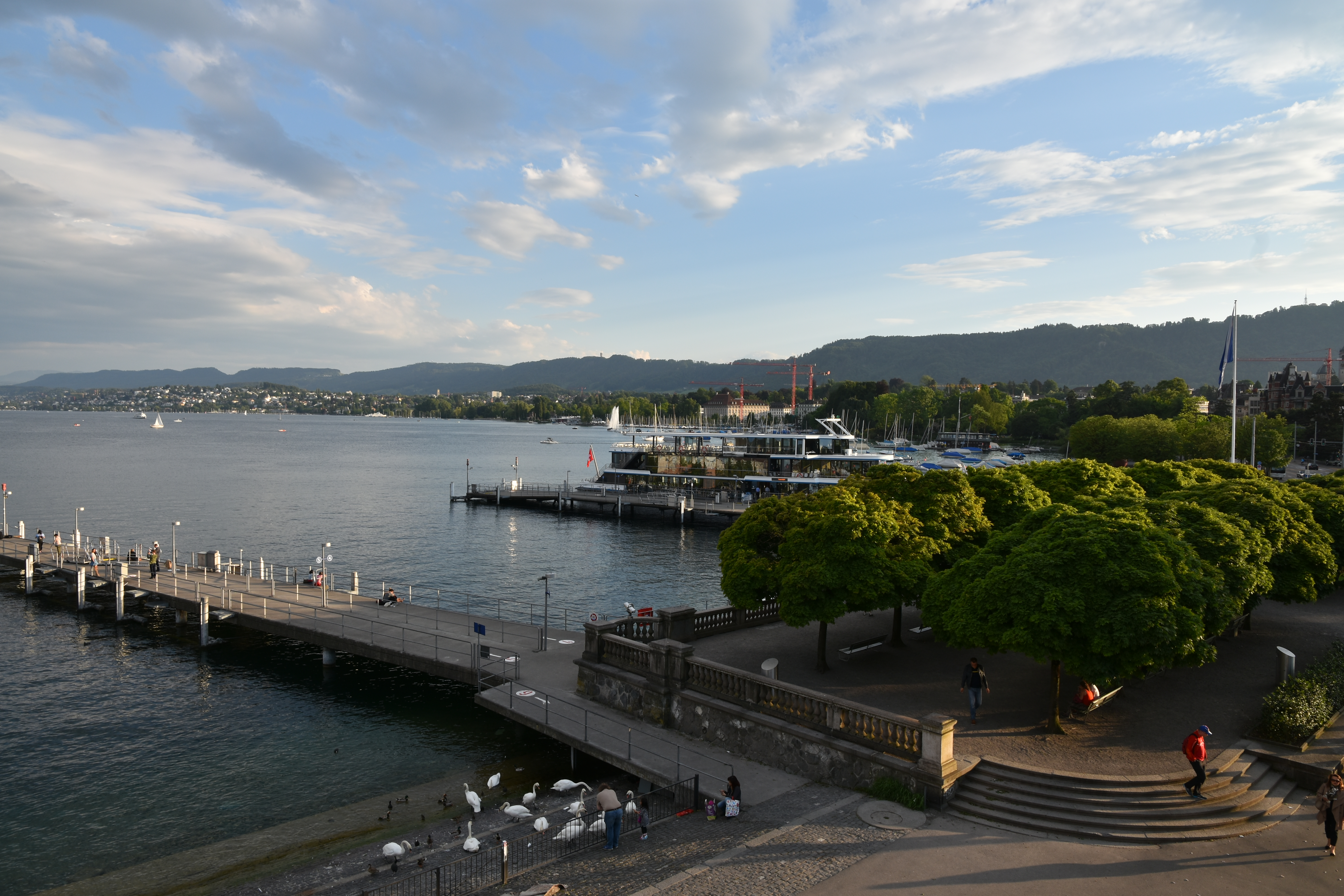
Bürkliterrasse in the foreground, Zimmerberg and Albis-Felsenegg in the background.

Bürkliterrasse, also named after Arnold Bürkli, is situated on the lake front. It was designed as a culmination of the Bahnhofstrasse and the lakeshore promenades. At its inauguration in 1887, the terrace was crowned by two huge plaster lions by Urs Eggenschwyler; however, they found little favor with the citizens and were removed two years later. Since 1952, the sculpture by Hermann Hubacher adorns the trees, showing the Abduction from Olympus, Zeus in the form of an eagle and his beautiful lover Ganymede. The original elm trees became diseased and were replaced by ball maples. The Bürkliterrasse is listed in the inventory of notable gardens and grounds of local importance which was established in 1989 as Inventar der schützenswerten Gärten und Anlagen von kommunaler Bedeutung (Inventory of the gardens and parks of communal significance and worthy of protection).

== Stadthausanlage ==
The upper end of the Bahnhofstrasse is today's most popular place for market events. This popular, rather small, urban facility became important at the time of the construction of the Bahnhofstrasse and the quay promenades, and became the elegant meeting point of Zürich's bourgeoisie. The still existing Musikpavillon was built by the Robert Maillard in 1908, and has excellent acoustics. The site's increasing use and the ageing of the trees forced the city government to develop a new design concept, which was based on the idea of redesigning this important market and venue area as a single tree-lined square. A Cedrus libani that was planted in the 1900s is one of the few remaining trees of that era.

== History ==
=== Prehistory ===
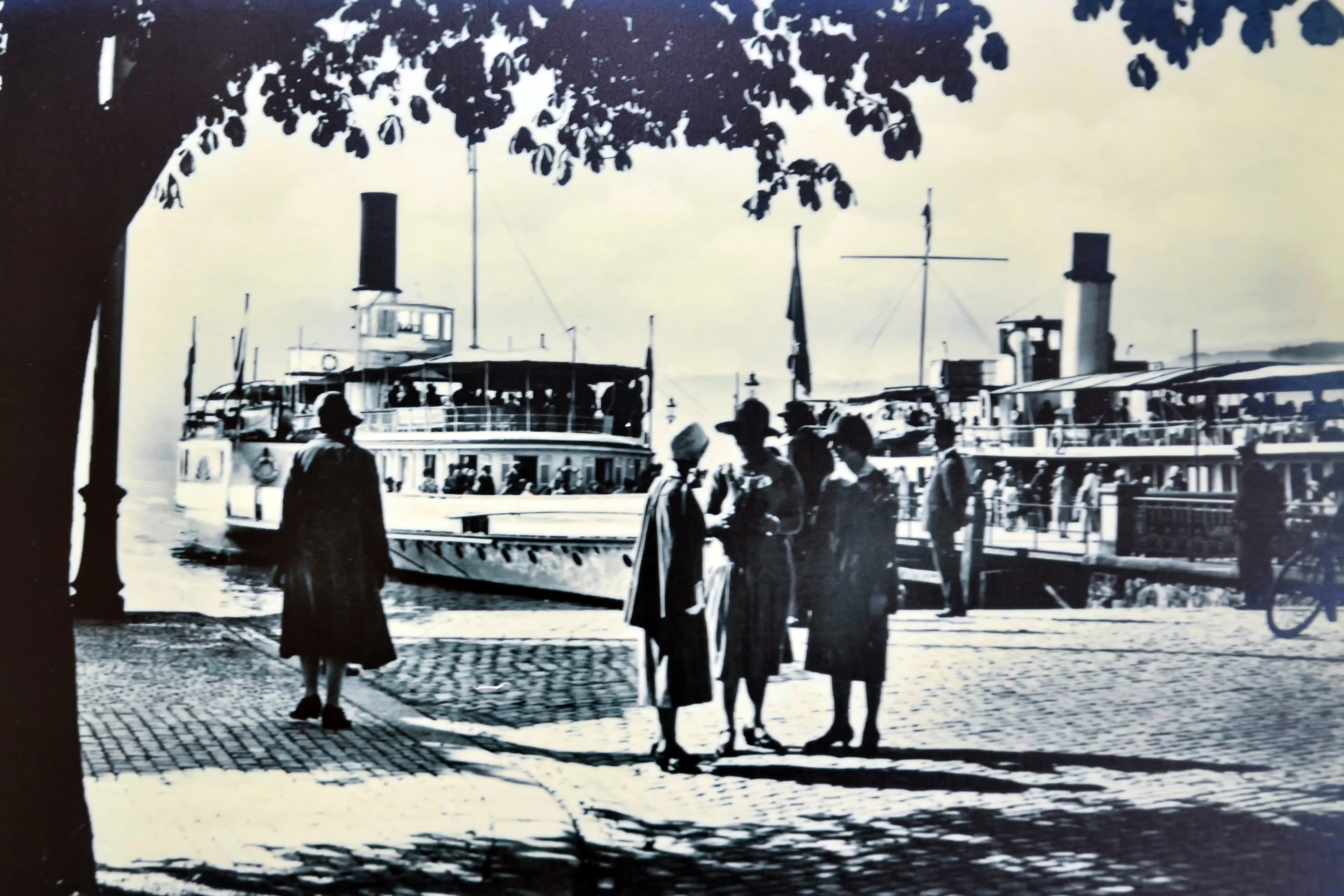
ZSG steamships Stadt Rapperswil and Stadt Zürich

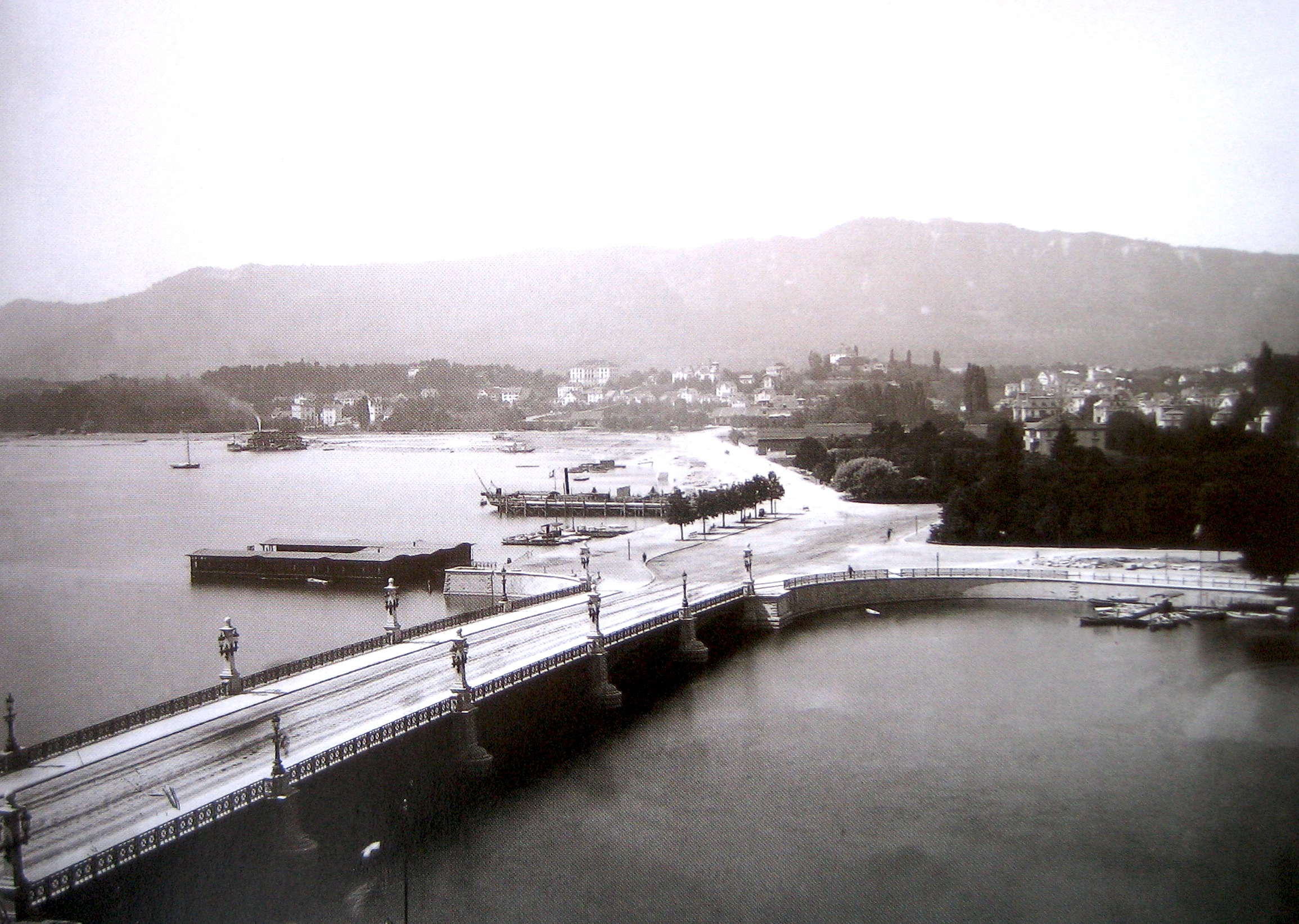
Quaibrücke area around 1884

Located in Zurich on what was then swampland between the Limmat and Lake Zurich around Sechseläutzenplatz on small islands and peninsulas, dwellings were set on piles to protect against occasional flooding by the Linth and Jona rivers. Zürich–Enge Alpenquai is located on the Lake Zurich lakeshore in Enge, a locality in the municipality of Zurich. There were neighbouring settlements at Kleiner Hafner and Grosser Hafner on what were then a peninsula and an island at the outflow of the lake to the Limmat, within an area of about 0.2 square kilometres (50 acres) within the city of Zurich. As well as being one of the fifty-six Swiss sites of the UNESCO World Heritage Site (Prehistoric Pile Dwellings Around the Alps), the settlements are also listed in the Swiss inventory of cultural property of national and regional significance as a "Class Object".

Despite the dredging for the construction of the Seequai between 1916 and 1919, an area of as much as 2.8 hectares (7 acres) with two cultural layers representing two different eras of settlement was preserved. Pile shoes indicating pre-historic dwellings were found at different levels in the cultural layers. A rich bar decoration of ceramics was found only in the lower layer, while the decoration on cannelure groups was limited to the upper layer, as well as some graphite-decorated fragments. So-called Potin lumps, the largest weighing 59.2 kilograms (131 lb), were found at Alpenquai in 1890. They consist of about 18,000 coins originating from the Celtic Eastern Gaul, others are of the Zürich type, that were identified with the local Helvetii tribe, and date to around 100 BC. The find is unique so far, and from the scientific research, it appears that the melting down of the lumps was not completed, and therefore the aim was to form cultic offerings. The site of the find was at that time at least 50 metres (164 ft) from the lake shore, and probably in water at a depth of 1 metre (3 ft) to 3 metres (10 ft).

=== Modern history ===
Stadthausanlage, the site of the former Kratzquartier accommodation and Bauhaus district at the Bauschänzli, was added in 1833 by landfill made up of rubble from the Baroque city fortification along the lake shore. This also marked the end of the medieval Kratzquartier as the distinctive urban axis, extending from Zentralhof, Kappelerhof and Münsterhof towards the Bürkliterrasse, where the poorer citizens of Zurich once lived. The medieval quarter was thoroughly overhauled between 1836 and 1900, for the purpose of developing a 'modern lakeshore city' in this large area. The area was reserved for the construction of new representative commerce buildings and the new federal parliament building, which was never built, but the Stadthaus was constructed at the former site of the Fraumünster abbey's building. As in 1848 the parliament building was erected in Bern. The site was used for a public city park that was named after the nearby old town hall (Stadthaus), and in 1922 the Swiss National Bank building was added.

Bürkliplatz is named for Arnold Bürkli (1833–1894), the engineer responsible for the construction of the city's quays. The men's bathhouse, built in 1883 alongside the Bürkliterrasse, was seriously damaged by a storm in 1964 and had to be demolished. From 1803 to 1886 the square was named Stadthausplatz and the term is still in official use for the park area.

== See also ==
- Arnold Bürkli
- Alpenquai
- Bauschänzli
