= Arboretum (Zurich) =

Park and arboretum in Switzerland

Arboretum Zürich
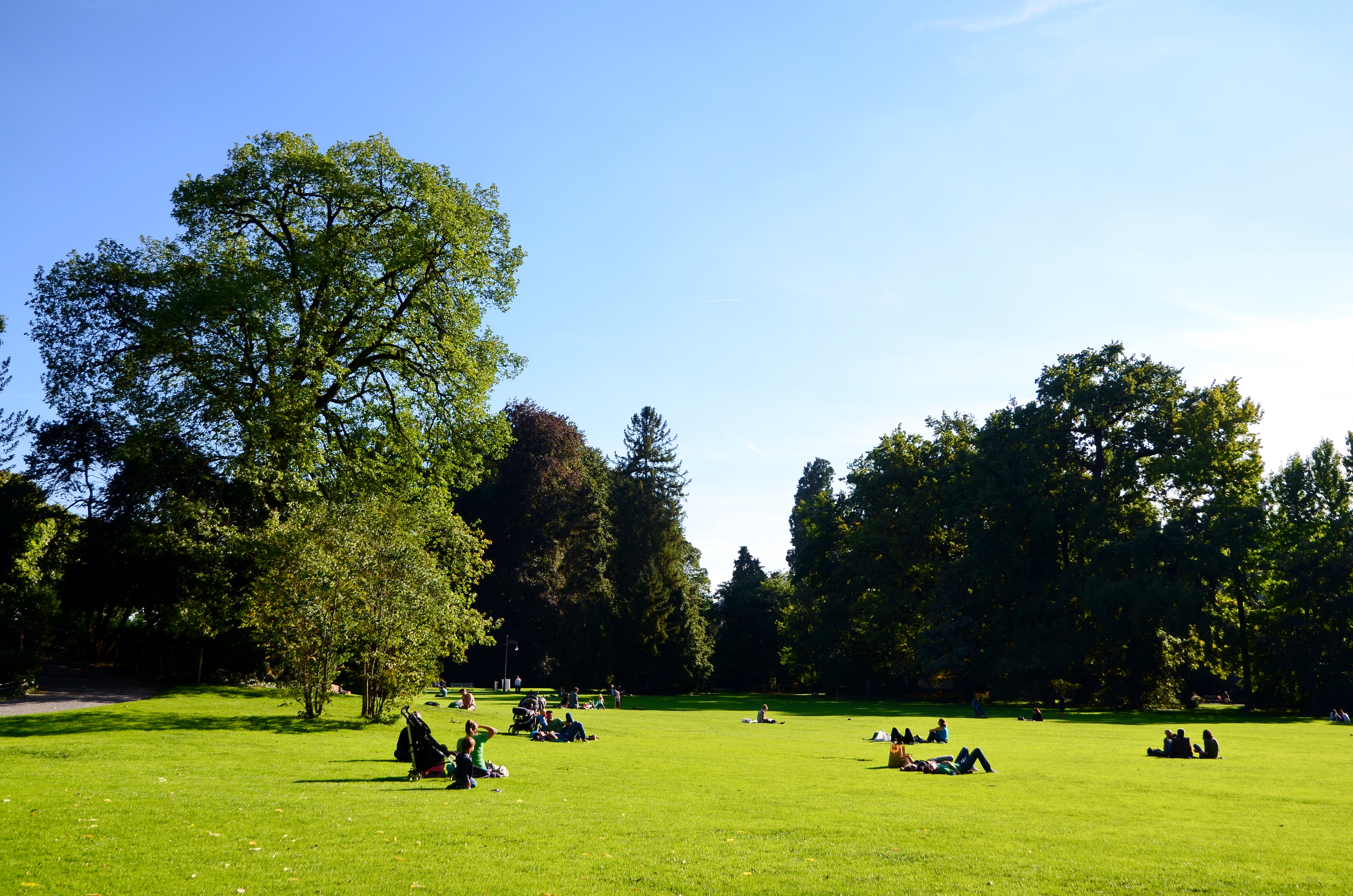
- Arboretum Zürich
- Interactive map of Arboretum Zürich
- Type: Urban park, Arboretum, Public bath
- Location: Enge in Zürich, Switzerland
- Coordinates: 47°21′47″N 8°32′11″E
- Area: 20 hectares (49 acres)
- Created: 1886–1887
- Owner: City of Zürich
- Operator: Grün Stadt Zürich
- Status: Open all year

The Arboretum is a botanical garden, public park and arboretum in Switzerland. The garden is part of the so-called Quaianlagen, a series of lakefronts in Zurich. The area also houses a lido, a public bath with a lake sauna, and the Voliere Zürich including the Vogelpflegestation, a unique sanatorium for birds.

== Location ==
Arboretum is situated in Zürich-Enge, as of today being a district of the city of Zurich, on Lake Zurich, lake shore being a part of the so-called Quaianlagen initiated by Arnold Bürkli. The park is separated by the General-Guisan-Quai and Mythenquai roads, from the lower lake shore promenade and the Enge harbour area.

Public transport is provided by the Zurich Tram route 5, as well by the VBZ bus lines 161 and 165 at the Rentenanstalt stop.

== History ==
The Arboretum is an important part of the historical lake quays (German: Quaianlagen) which were inaugurated in 1887. The quays are an important milestone in the development of the modern city of Zurich, as by the construction of the new lake front, Zurich was transformed from the medieval small town on the Limmat and Sihl rivers to an attractive modern city on the Zürichsee lake shore.

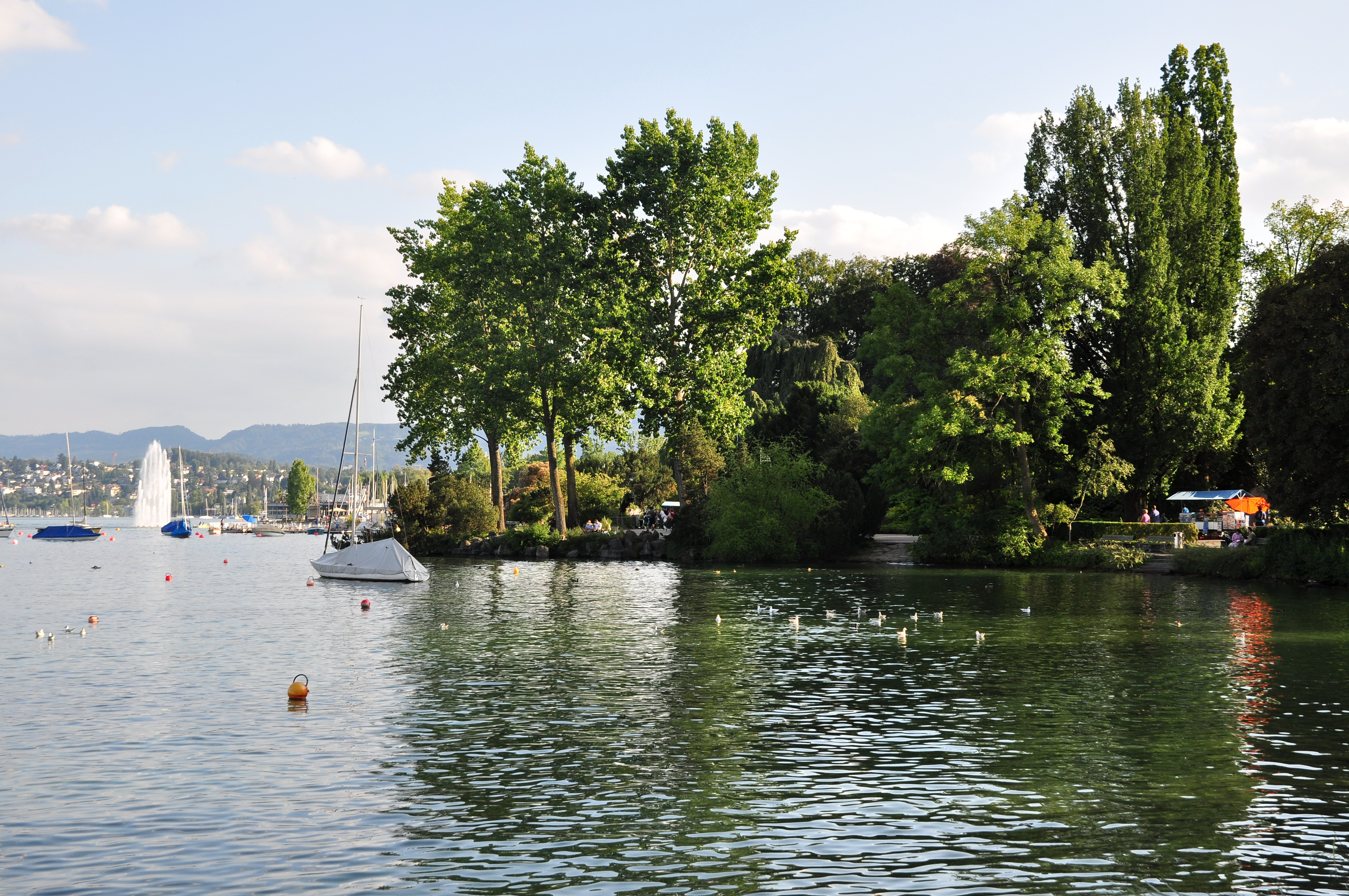

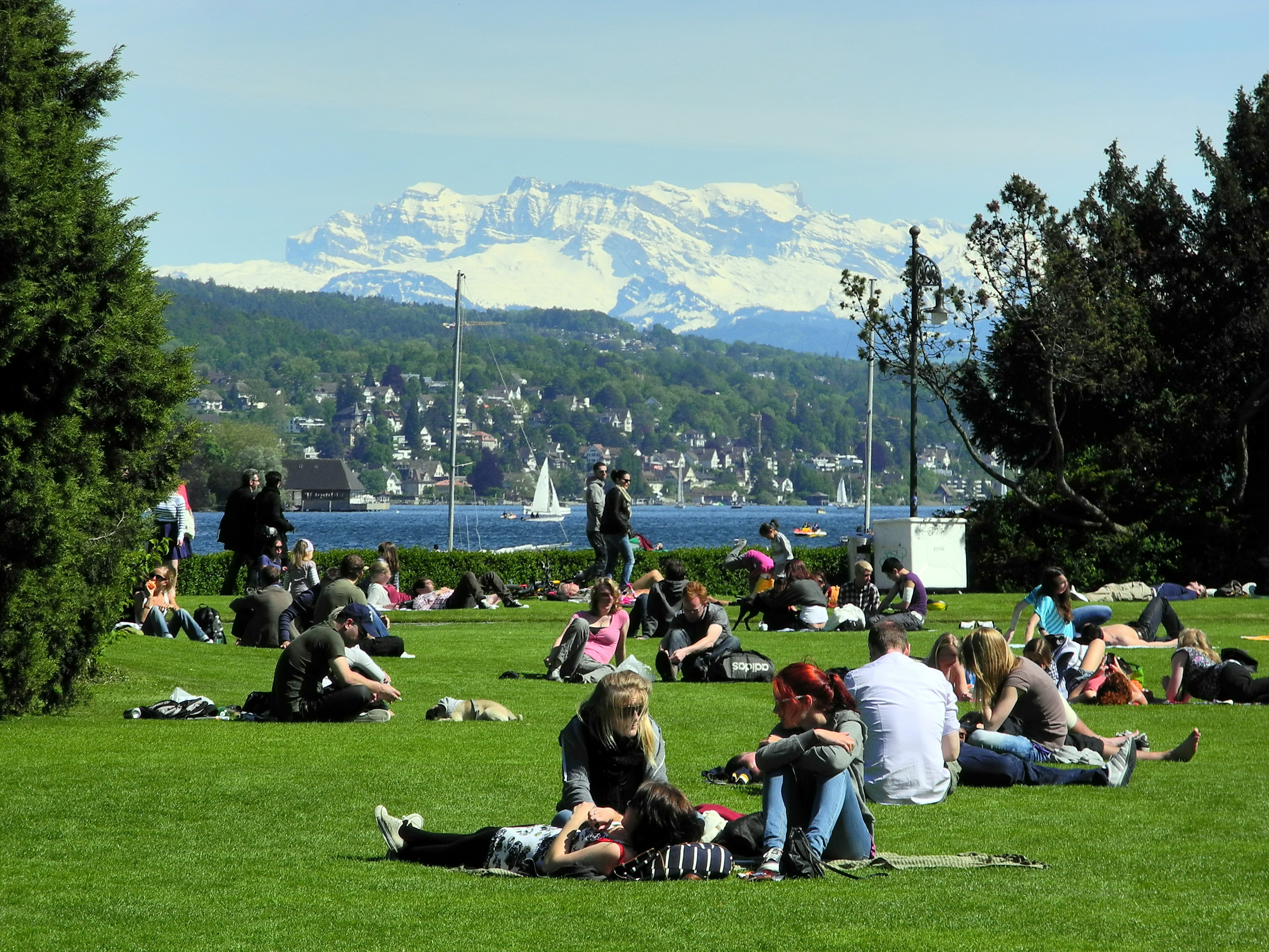

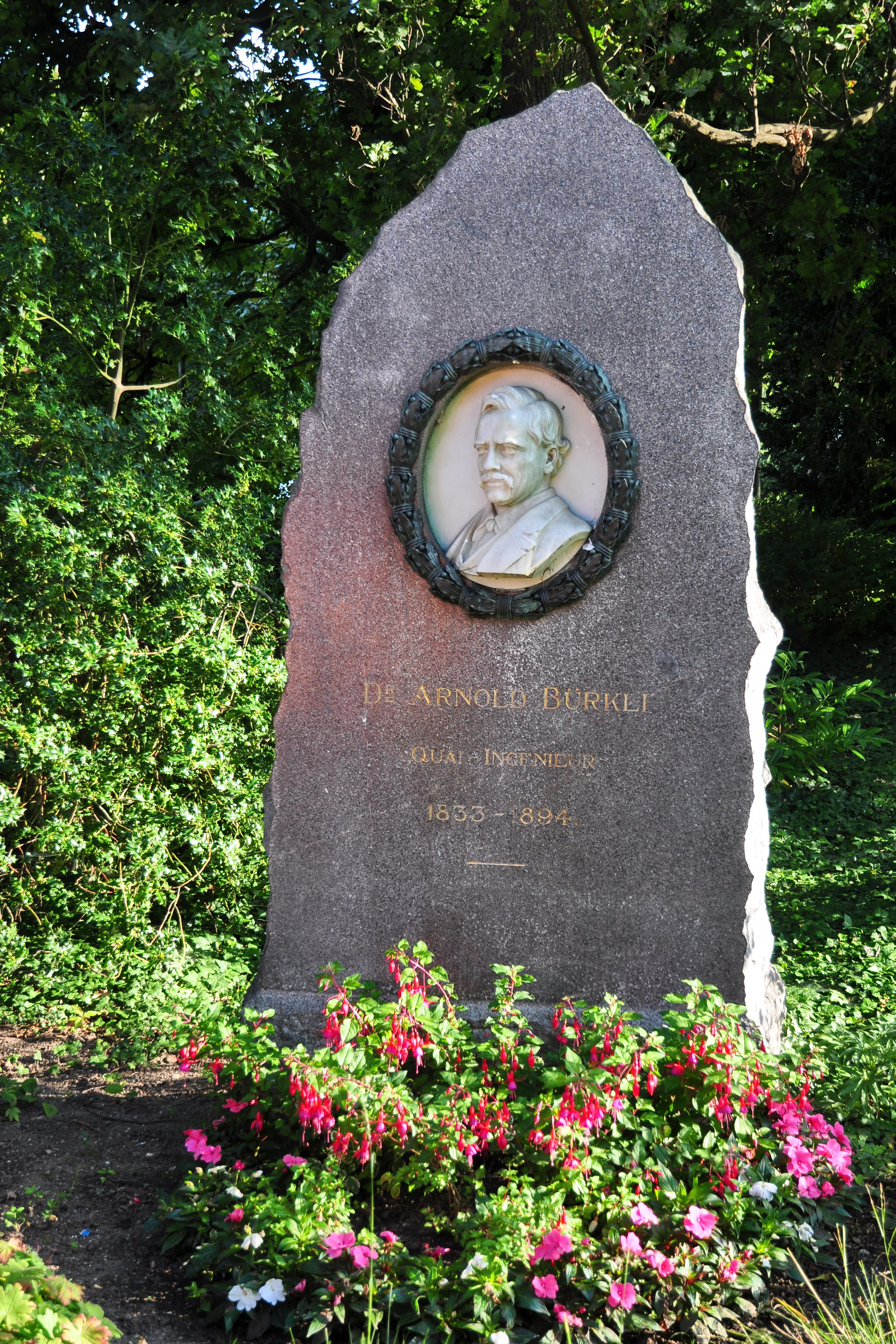

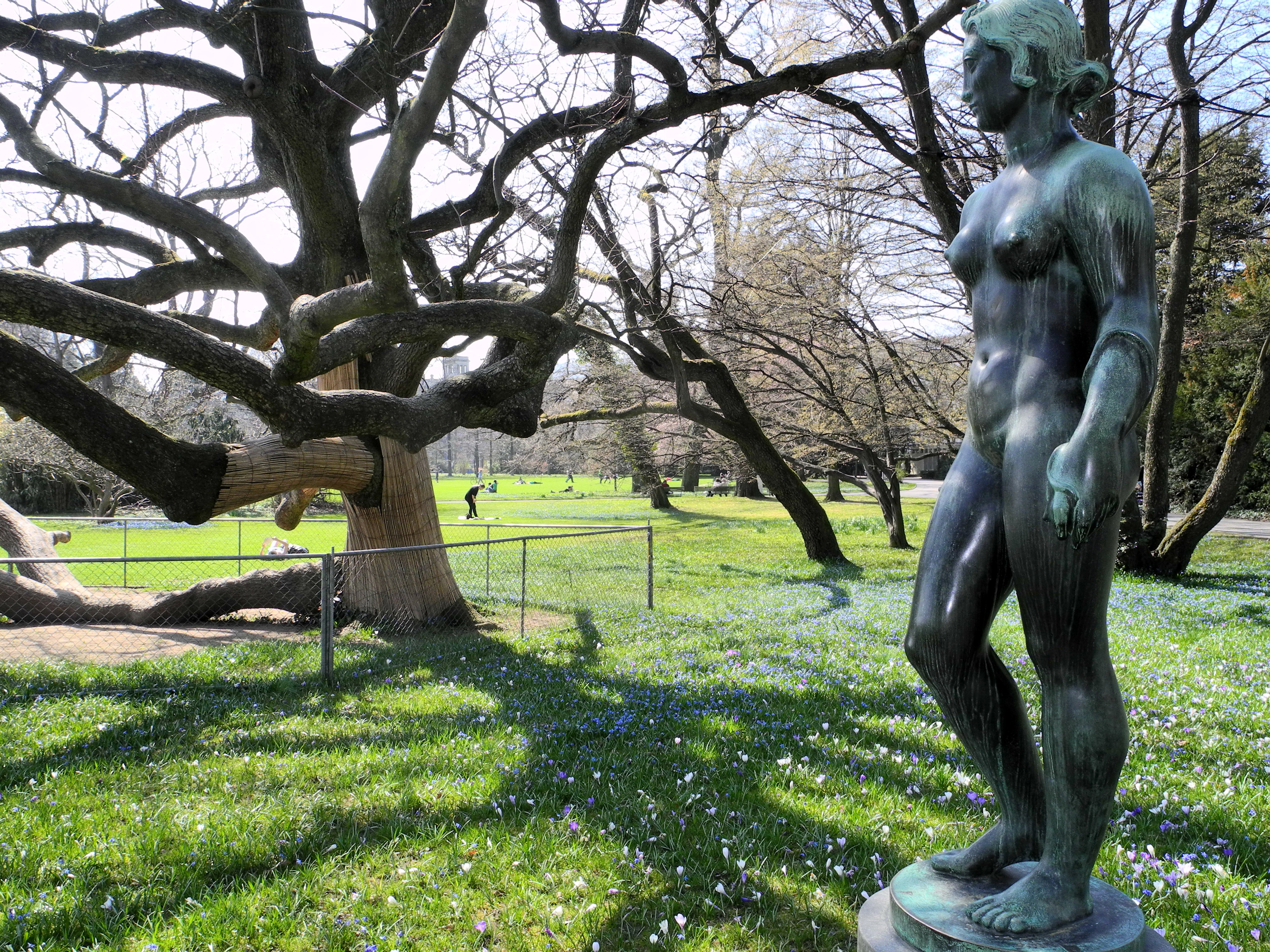

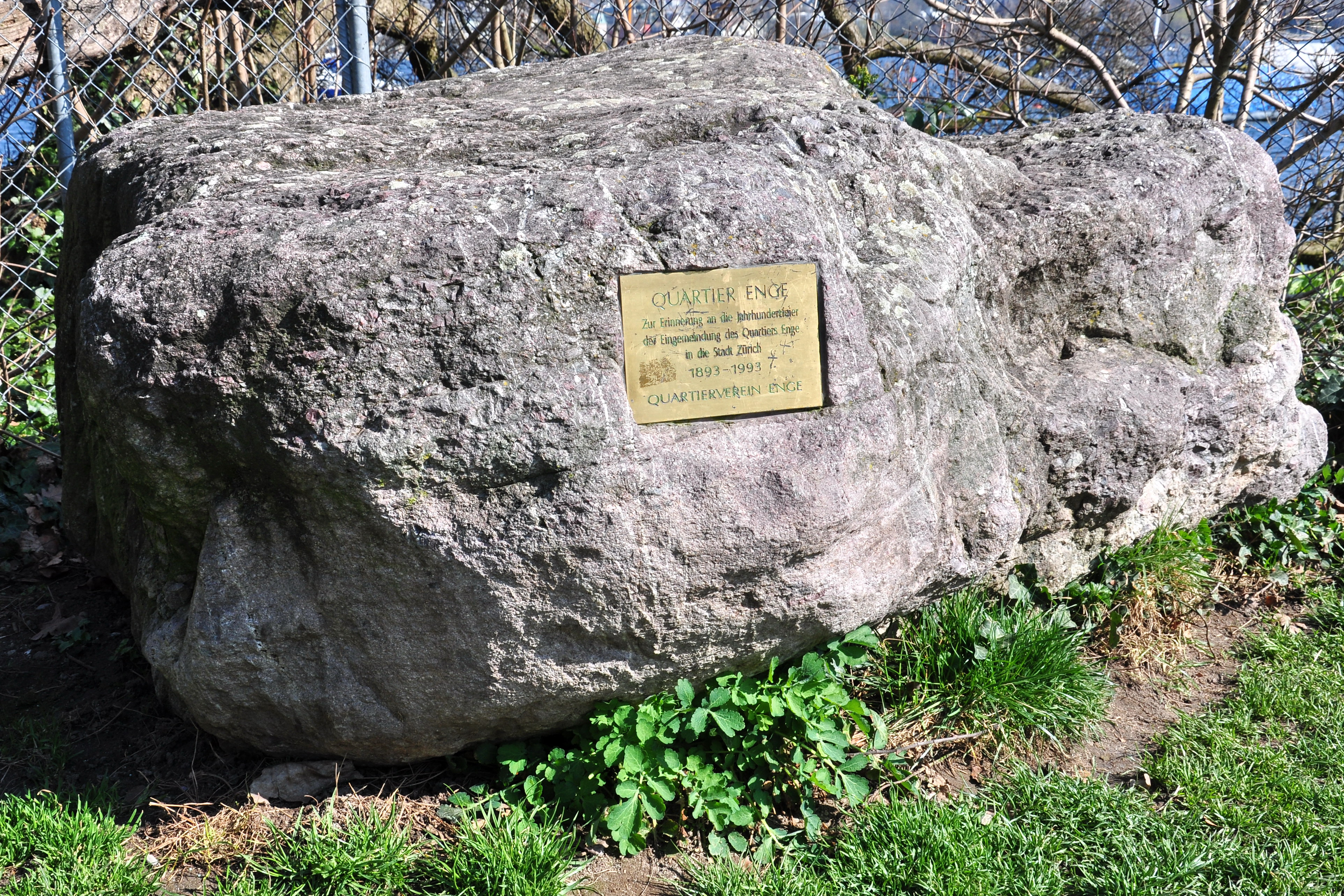

The Arboretum was created according to the then-current style of a public garden. Originally, it was intended as a cultivated and richly equipped, but otherwise conventional parkland. Shortly before the construction work started, a group of botany and geology professors made proposals to enrich the park concept, in due consideration of scientific aspects. A tree collection with exotic plants, a rock collection, and an Alpine panorama accounting the Glarus Alps view from the park should provide to the citizens a piece of education on a Sunday stroll. The affiliated formed Arboretum Kommission comprised also the landscape architects Evariste Mertens and Otto Froebel and the botany Professor Carl Schröter, who managed to communicate science and beauty in the new park. In 1886 the work for the design of the plant started, and Otto Froebel teamed up with his professional colleagues Evariste Mertens. Cleverly, they modeled the fresh lake level terrain wrested from and the park in the style of the late garden laid, and succeeded in the picturesque grouping of trees. The scientific concept is rounded off by a rock collection, as well as the first alpine panorama of Zurich. The trees of the so-called China-group on the lake shore hide three one-man bunkers, which were built in 1942 to 'protect' the lower lake basin; since 1992, the bunkers are under cantonal conservation. The Arboretum is obtained largely in its original composition, but in the 1980s it became an urgent task to continue the original scientific concept in the replanting, however, larger groups of trees had to be replaced and new planted trees had to be integrated in the existing planting concept. The basis for the development of the park maintenance according to the original concept was introduced in 1985.

== Collection and structure ==
Today it presents many trees in mature beauty. The trees developed in over a hundred years enormously; many groups of trees have reached their maximum, others have already been renewed. The challenge of the coming decades is to renew the tree collection the scientific concept of the past, to also future generations to the refined richness of the botanical collection to be true to. The Arboretum is maintained as first historic park system in Zurich since 1985 according to garden conservation aspects.

=== Segments according to Professor Schröter ===
Based on the concept of Professor Schröter, the tree collection is divided into three segments:

- The largest segment comprises nine sections and groups of trees that originate from different regions of the world. In the early 19th century, the choice of the trees was unconventional, among them species from southern Switzerland, the Alps, the Jura Mountains, the Mediterranean and the Middle East, the southern and eastern states of the US, from California, Canada, Japan and China.
- The second segment includes four systematic floral districts, and trees of the same plant families, among them Elms, Maples, ash trees and Beech.
- Situated on the small lake shore hill, the third segment consists solely of the plants of the Tertiary flora, i.e. of the formation of the Alps. These trees had been native to Central Europe before the Late Glacial Maximum including plants spread from Scandinavia to the southern area of Europe.
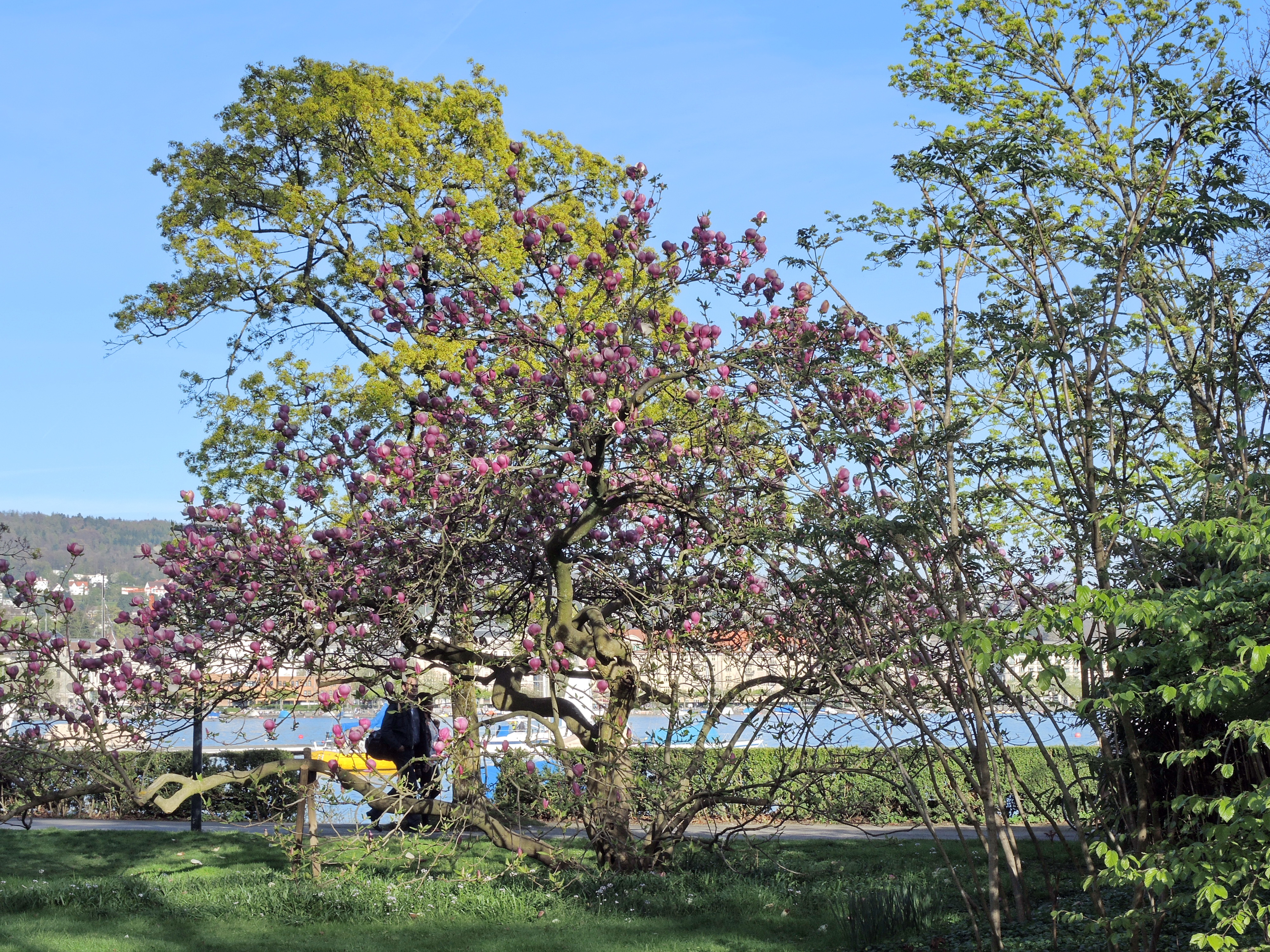

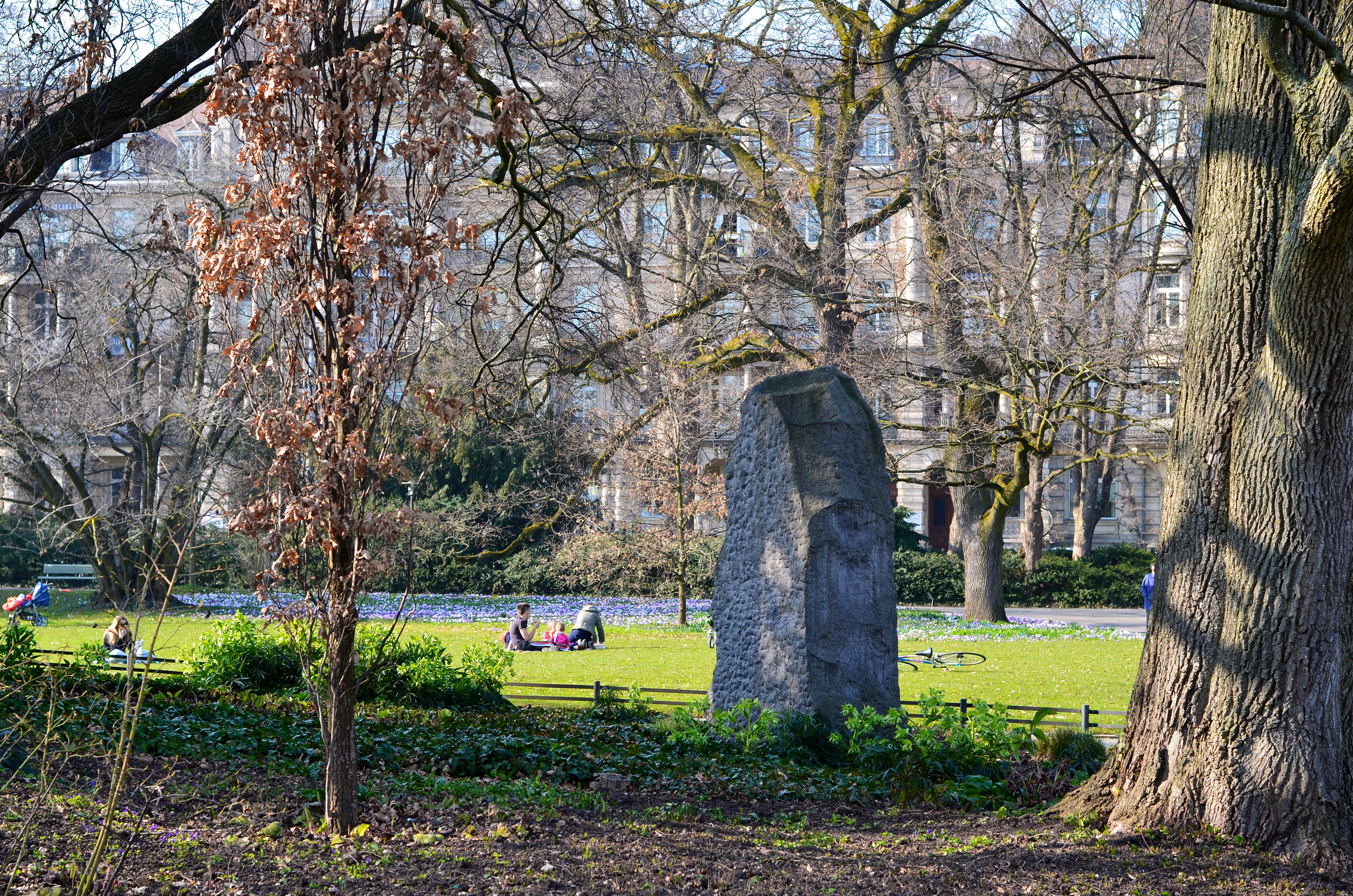

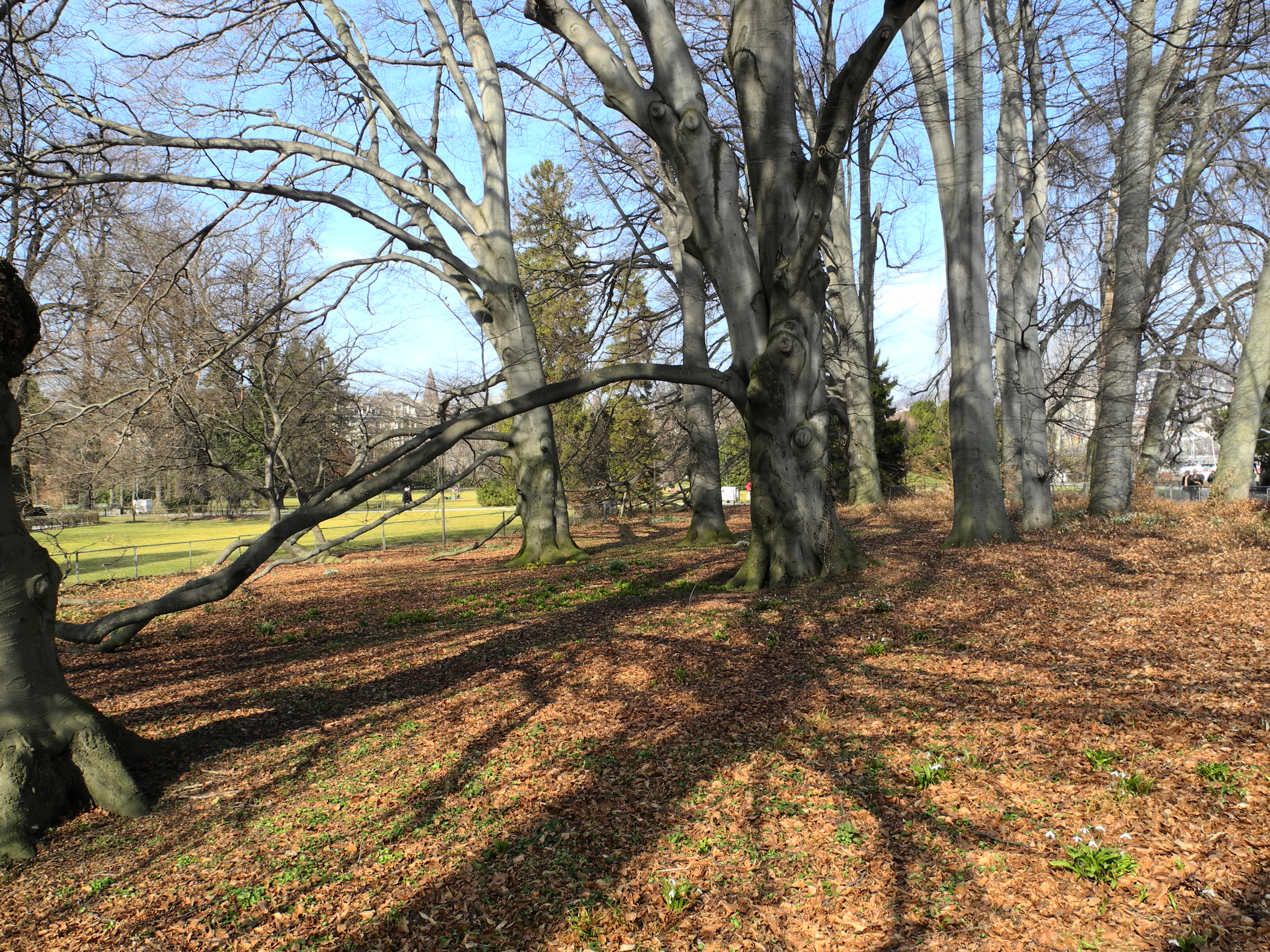

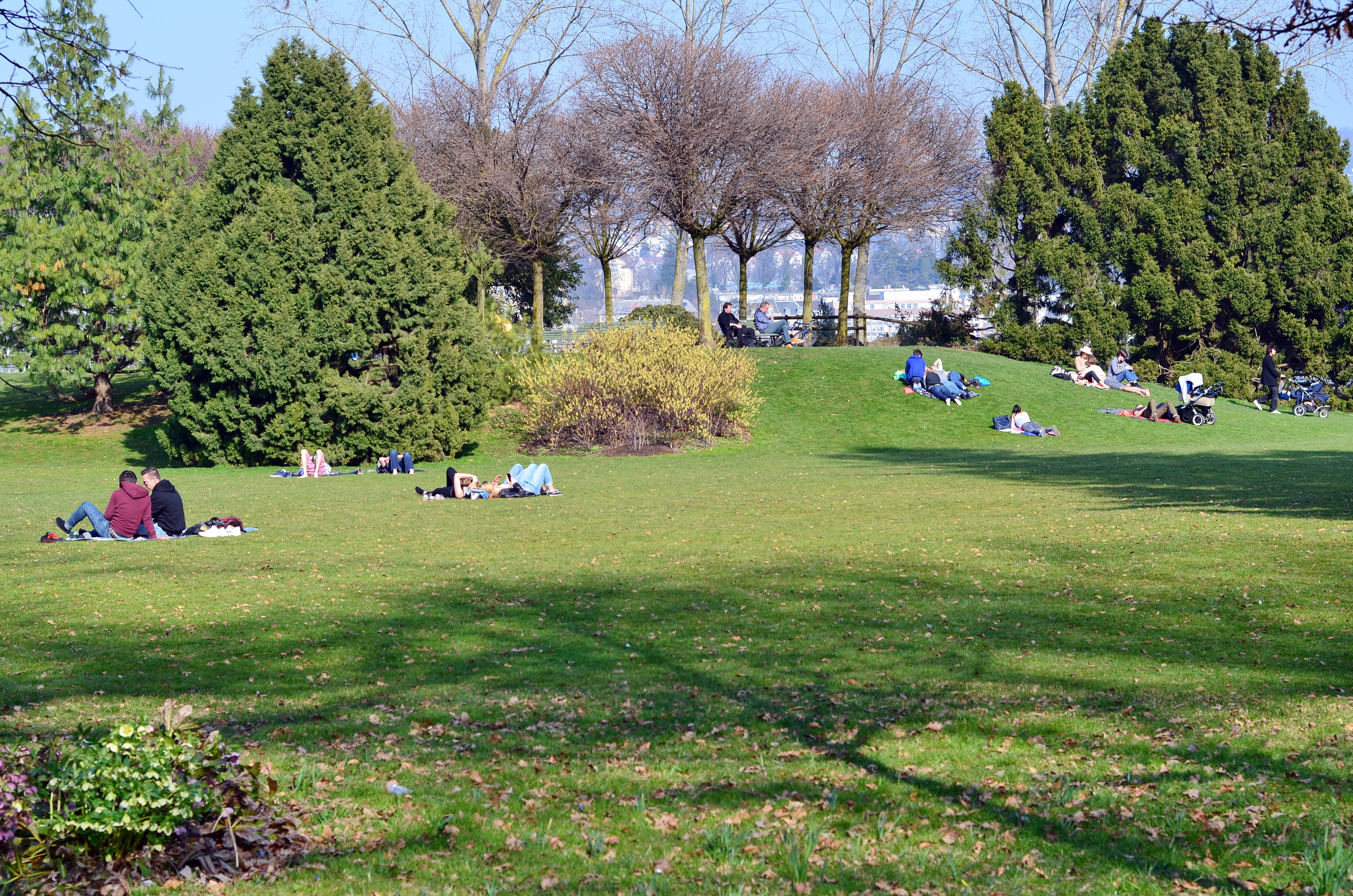

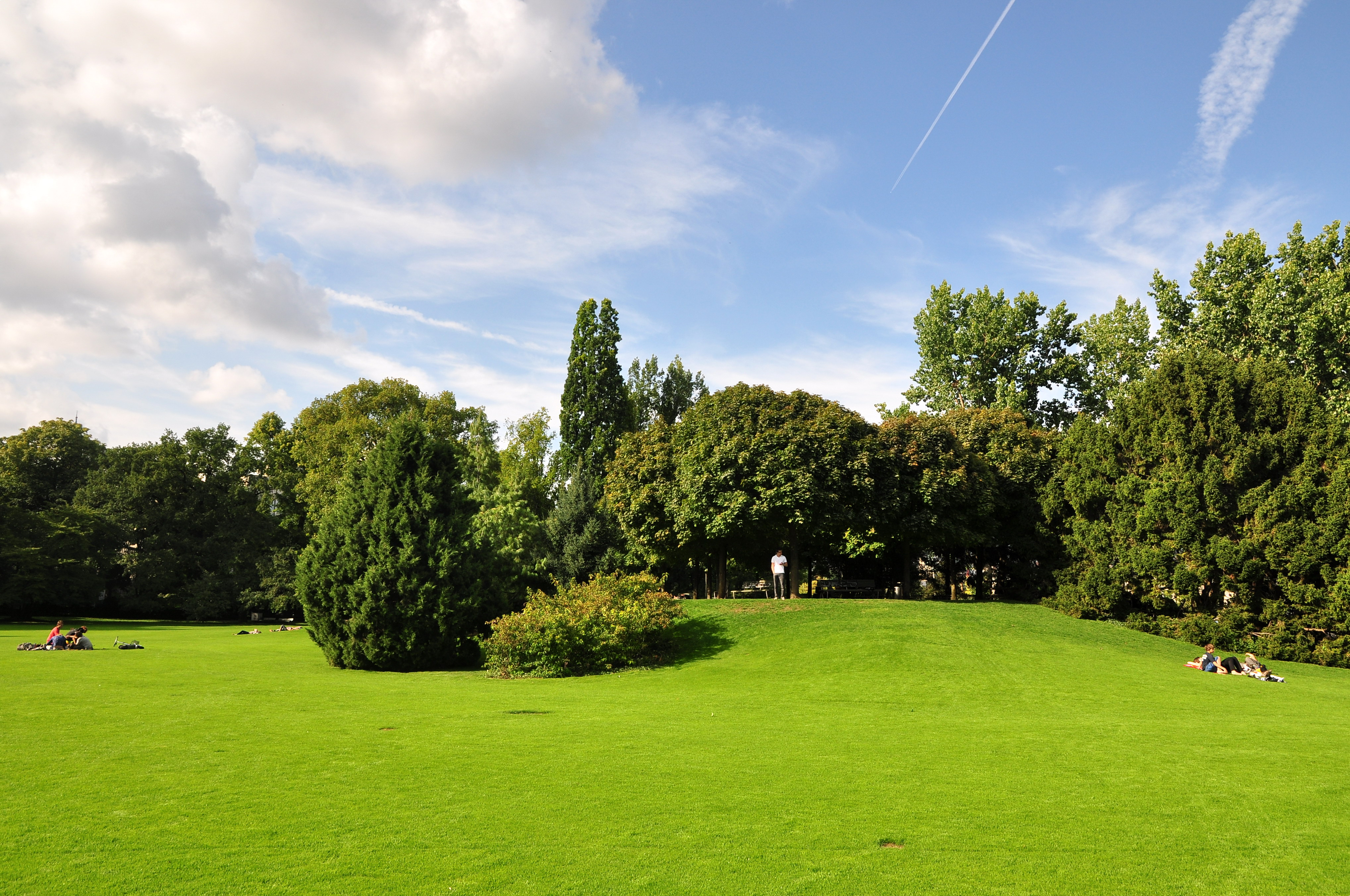

=== Attractions of the tree collection ===
A striking solitaire is the Magnolia acuminata at the sculpture of Aphrodite (1921) by the Danish sculptor Einar Utzon-Frank towards the General-Guisan-Quai. The tree was imported from the USA respectively the east coast between the states of New York and Georgia, and wears from late spring to early summer blue-gray flowers, changed to pink in early autumn fruits and later deep red cucumbers. Its down to earth reaching, strong branches predestine it almost to become a popular climbing tree for children. In addition, the China group also is represented by Prunus serotina and Toona sinensis, a cedar, which is native to northern and western China.

At the Enge lido is situated an impressive Beech group whose branches are cascading to the ground. Inside the group of trees are also powerful green-leaved trees, but also the purple Fagus sylvatica f. purpurea, and the outer ends form narrow-leaved Beeches. In the summer when the trees are in full leaf, they form a tree cathedral, in those shadows reigns a soothing coolness and soft twilight. Since 2006 an open gap in the middle of the group, as the central Beech unfortunately had to be cut. The death of the otherwise durable Beech is also a result of poor soil conditions, which occur on the artificial lake shore bed. Just steps away, there is a beautiful example of a tree grafting; aFraxinus americana graftage based on a slower growing surface, thus the strain at the intersection is almost seamlessly thicker.

The lakeward side of the easterly hill section is meant by the garden architects as an open-minded moraine, and an alpinum, a collection of mountain plants, but some years later was abandoned as one of the 'garden fashions' of the 19th century. The high maintenance perennial planting was replaced with flowers shrubs as being much more easier to care by the park maintenance workers. Since 1988 the alpine garden blooms again, but the mountain plants are found only on the sunniest places to the southwest, and rather robust blooms perennials, including Sedums and Hylotelephium from the nearby Sukkulentensammlung. The original rock formation on the lake shore was intended, to lead the eye of the observer in the distance to the Alps. The information board that is illustrating the Alpine panorama is supposed to have been the first of its kind in Zurich, to round off the concept of education and edification of the Zurich citizenship. Around the increased park benches at the hill, there is arranged tree group that consists almost entirely of dark Pinophytas. The garden architectes intended to extend the perspective by planting initially bright tree species with small leaves, seamlessly to dark-leaved species, and finally to exit the arboretum towards the Enge harbour in a perspective sense to evergreen species. After the devastation of the Lothar storm in December 1999, this group of trees had to be overall replaced, based on the first tree inventory of 1898. The total renewal of the group had the advantage that all trees have the identical starting conditions and sufficient light to flourish in a few decades to ensure original character of the arboretum.

== Aviary and bird's sanatory ==
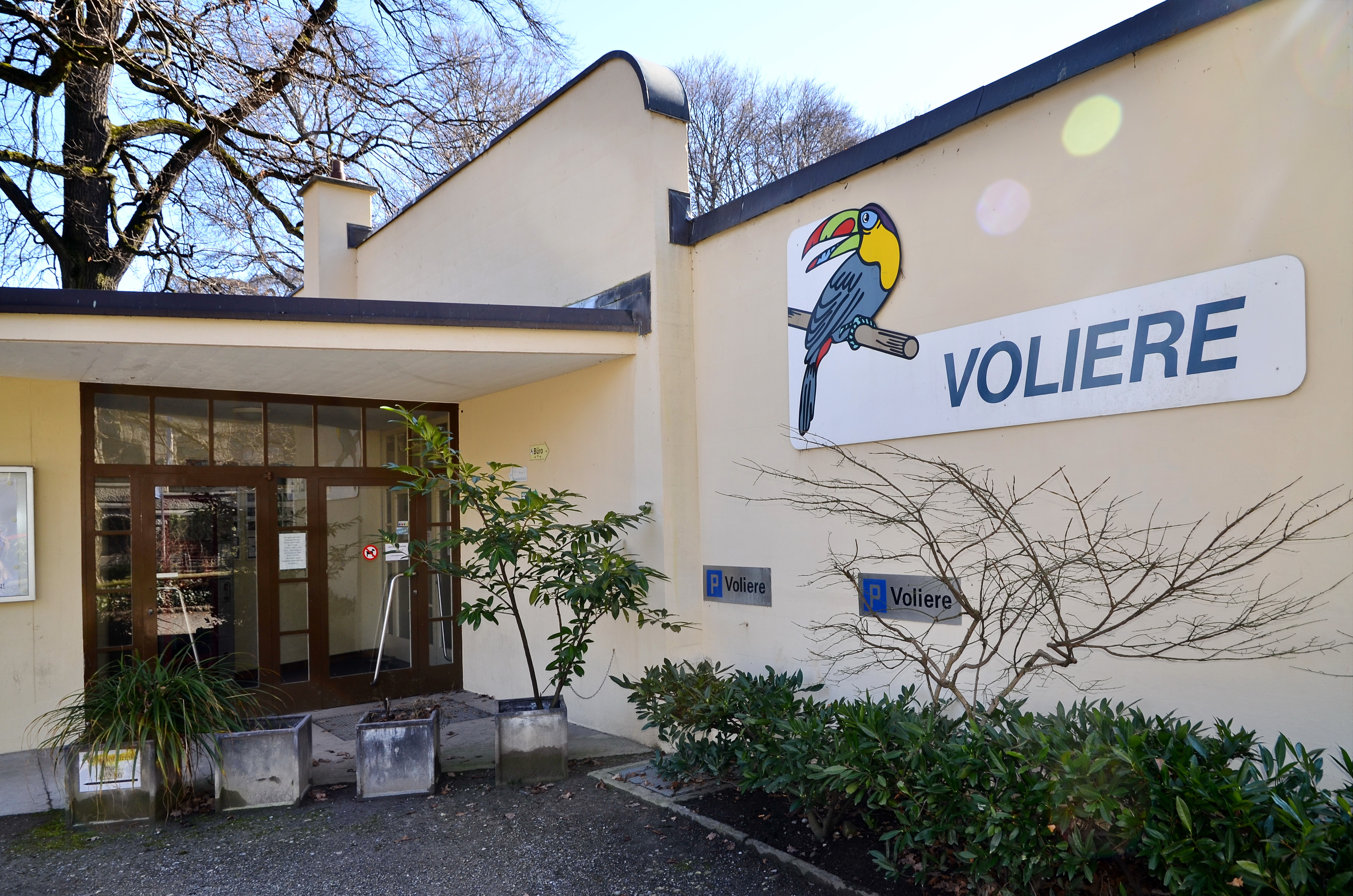
Voliere Zürich towards Mythenquai

The Arboreturm also houses a small aviary and the so-called Vogelpflegestation, meaning a unique veterinary hospital for wild birds. It claims to be the most important emergency department in Switzerland for injured and sick wild birds, and also for young birds that were fallen from their nests. Established in 1902, it is focused on the bird rescue and the publicity for the population, and therefore houses a unique competence center for native and exotic birds emerged. The foundation is financed by contributions and donations from its about 700 members, and by donations from individuals and prestigious foundations. The bird care station has a reputation, which goes far beyond the Swiss borders. For tourists, in particular for ornithologists, it is a very attractive point of attraction due to its unique portfolio of exotic birds. But also the townspeople themselves, use the wheelchair visitors hall of the aviary to expand their knowledge of the world of birds, of which approximately 111 exotics in 33 species are represented. Each year there are around 45,000 visitors, including many tourists, who get free information about some of the rarest bird species of Switzerland in eight naturally designed inn walks and three landscape-like outdoor enclosures.

== Seebad Enge ==
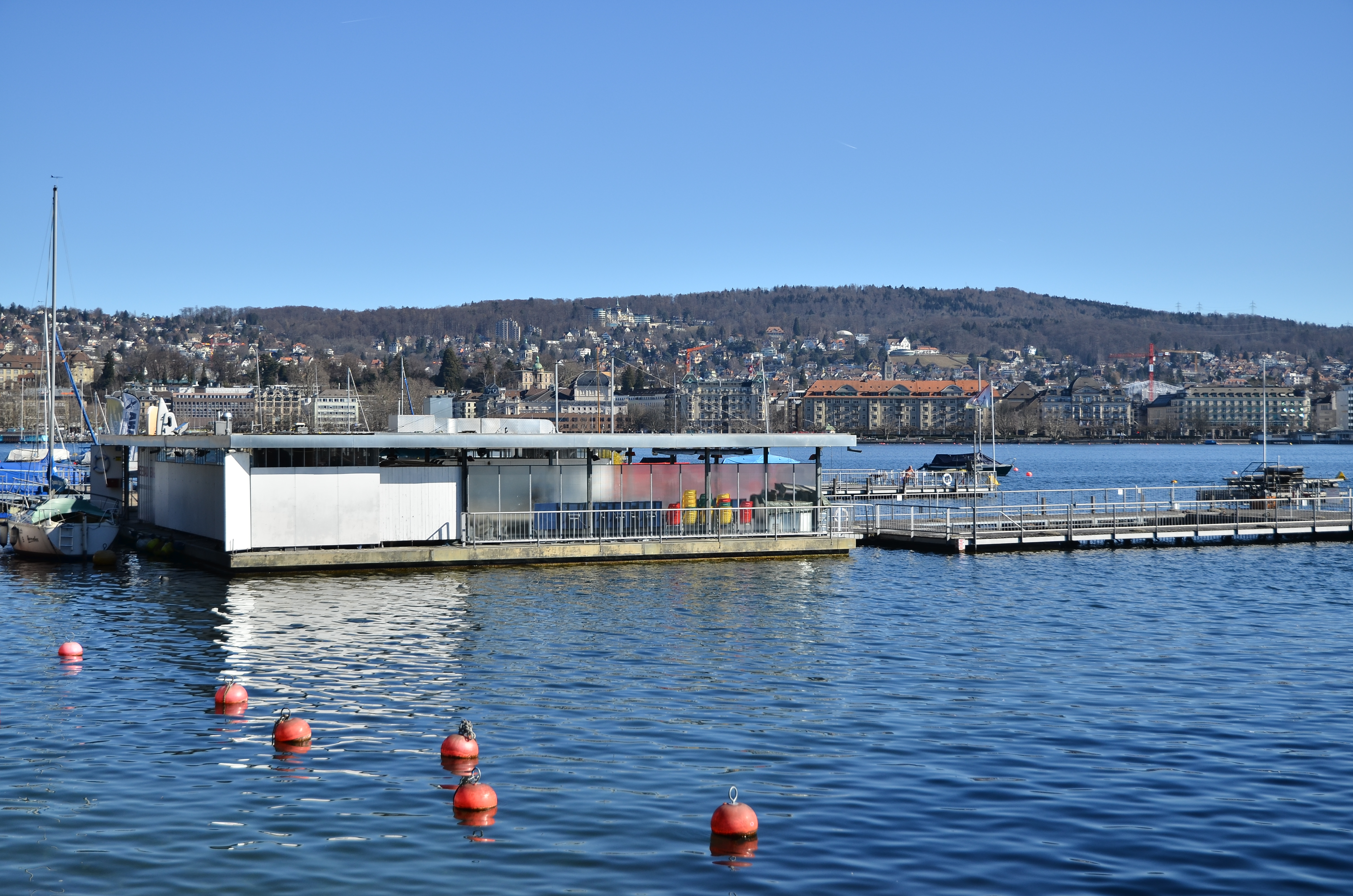
Enge lido, Adlisberg in the background

The lido of the Arboretum is also a popular public bath, and also houses the swimming Seebad Enge, which is also a unique lakeshore sauna during winter season. The swimming lido consists of a building construction that is anchored in the lake. Conceived by Robert Landolt, the two-piece bathing complex was built in 1959/60, since 1999 it is private-owned and provides an open lake side sauna and gastronomy which were installed in 2003/04.

== Arnold Bürkli Memorial ==
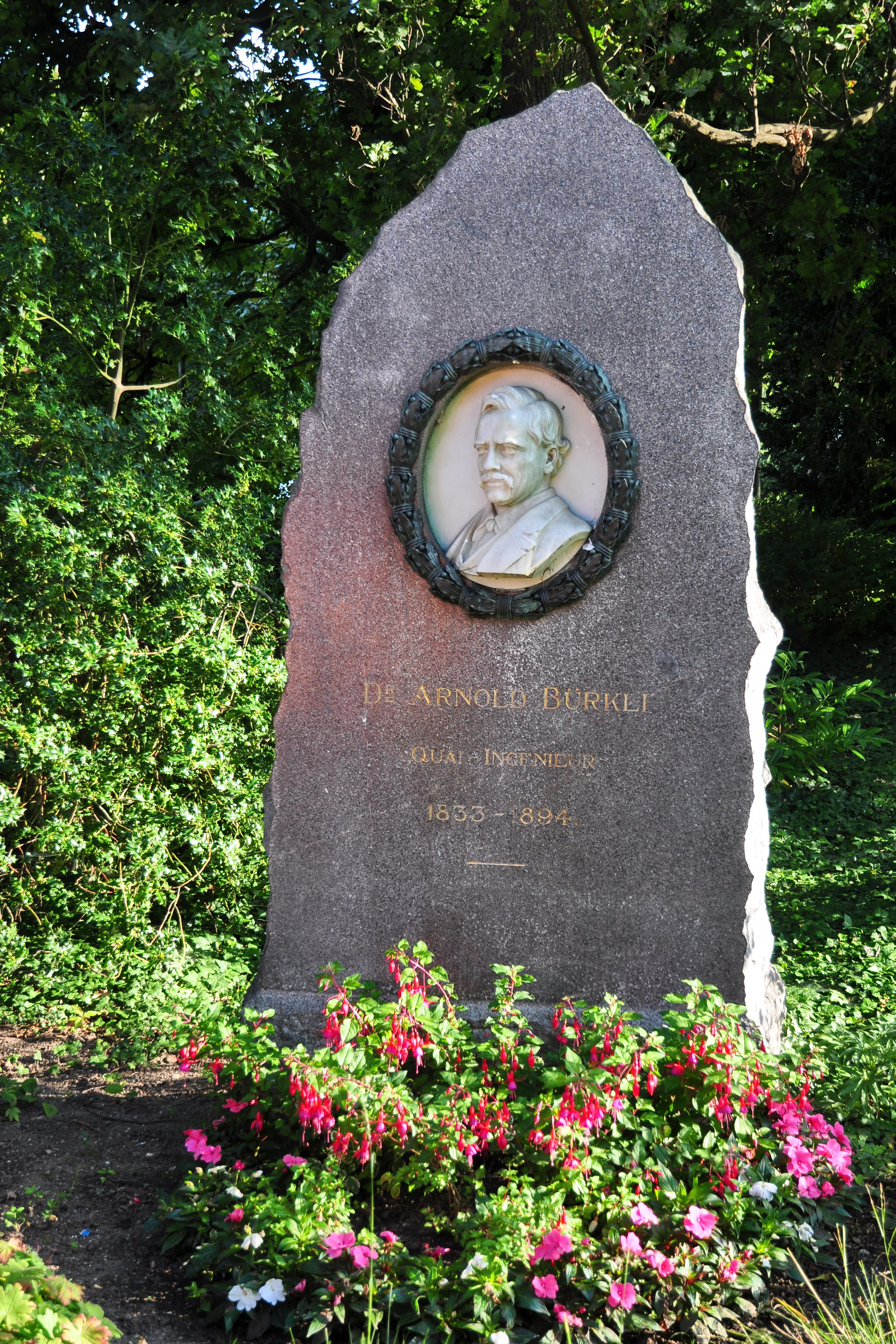
Arnold Bürkli memorial

At the foot of the lake shore hill that elevates around 3 metres (10 ft), the Arnold Bürkli memorial honors the tireless creating engineer being the driving force behind the new quays. The simple monument was inaugurated in 1899, five years after his death, at Bürkli's favorite place in the Arboretum, or by the words of the sculptor Richard Kissling, in the midst of his creation.

== Cultural heritage of national importance ==
The Arboretum Zurich is listed in the Swiss inventory of cultural property of national and regional significance as a Class A object of national importance.

== Literature ==
- Gartenbiografien: Orte erzählen. vdf Hochschulverlag AG, ETH Zürich, Zurich 2013, ISBN 978-3-7281-3579-7.
