= Voliere Zürich =

Aviary and veterinary hospital in the Arboretum in Zürich, Switzerland

Coordinates: 47°21′42″N 8°32′09″E

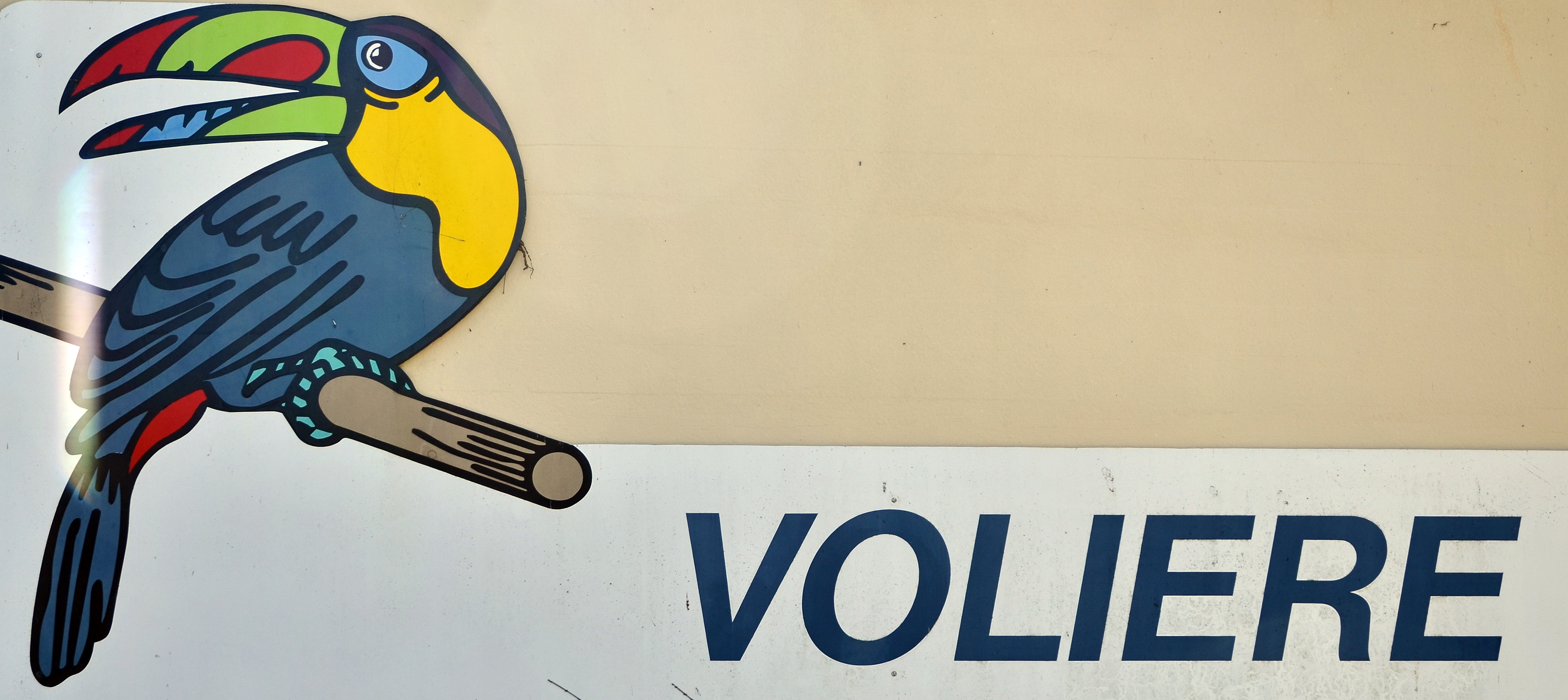

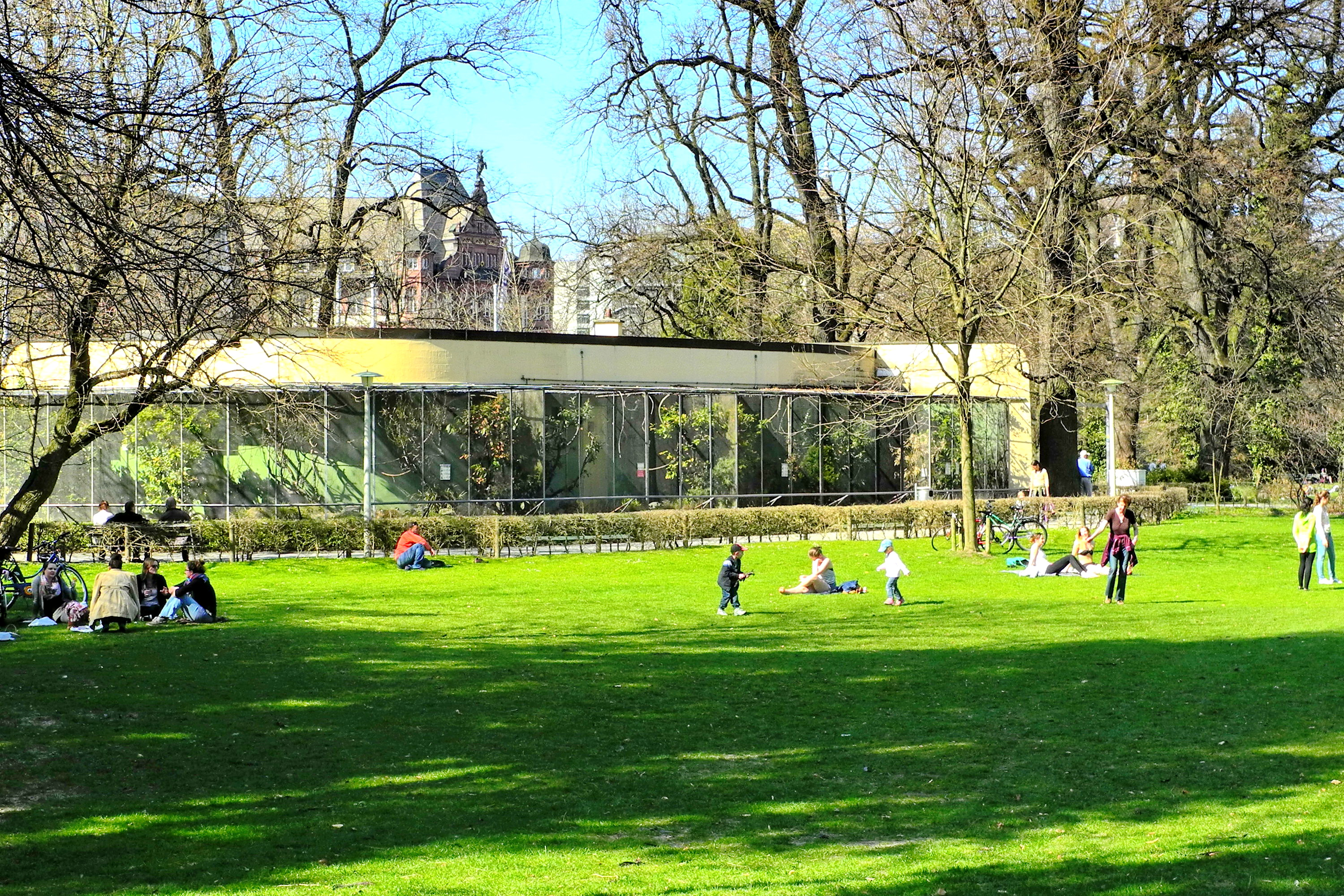
- Voliere Zürich – Vogelpflegestation
- Interactive map of Voliere Zürich
- Date opened: 1902
- Location: Arboretum Zürich; Mythenquai 1, CH-8002 Zürich
- No. of animals: 111+
- No. of species: 33
- Website: voliere.ch

The Voliere Zürich is an aviary and veterinary hospital situated in the Arboretum in the Swiss city of Zurich. It also houses the so-called Vogelpflegestation, a unique sanatory for birds.

== Location ==
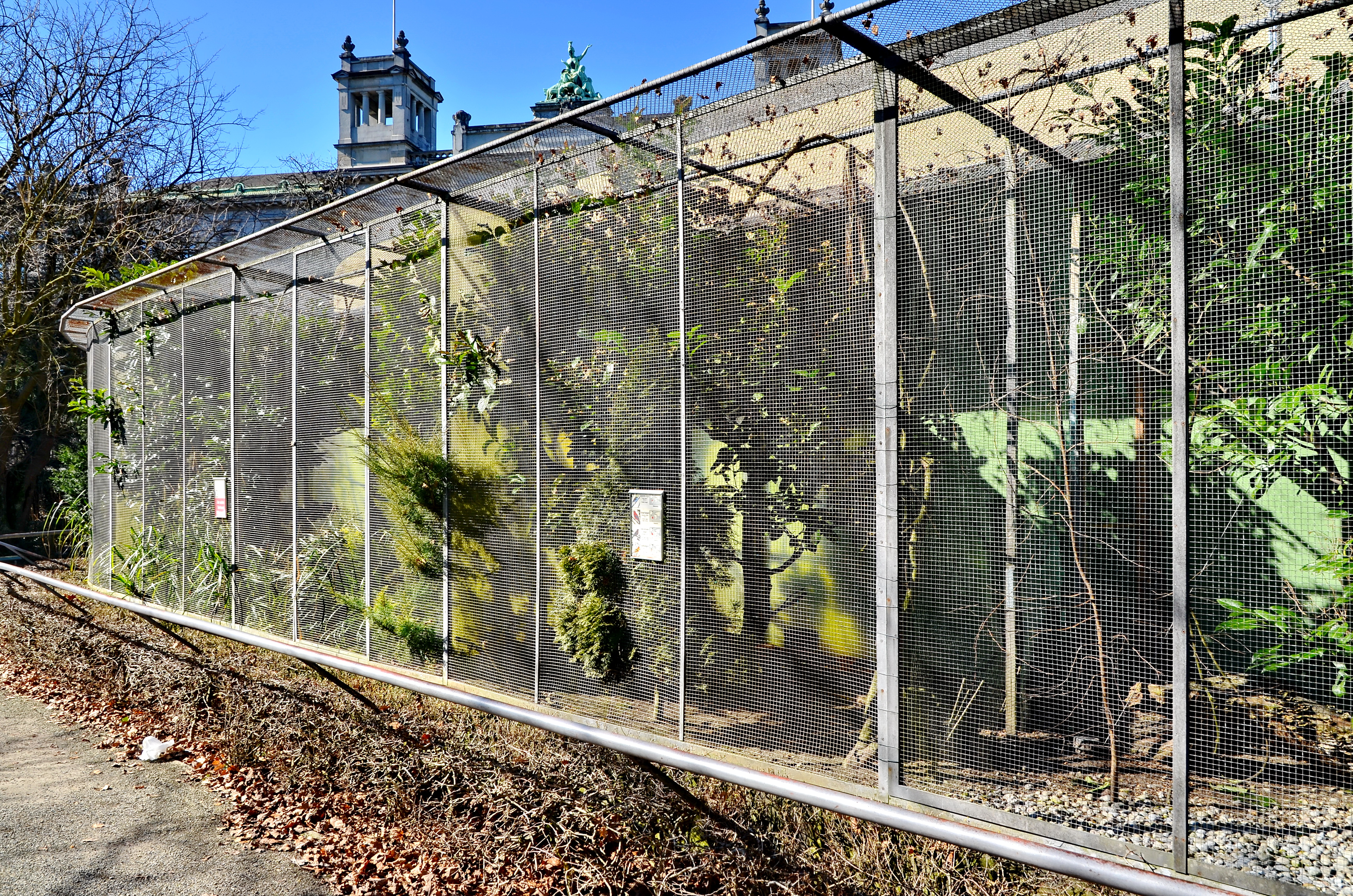

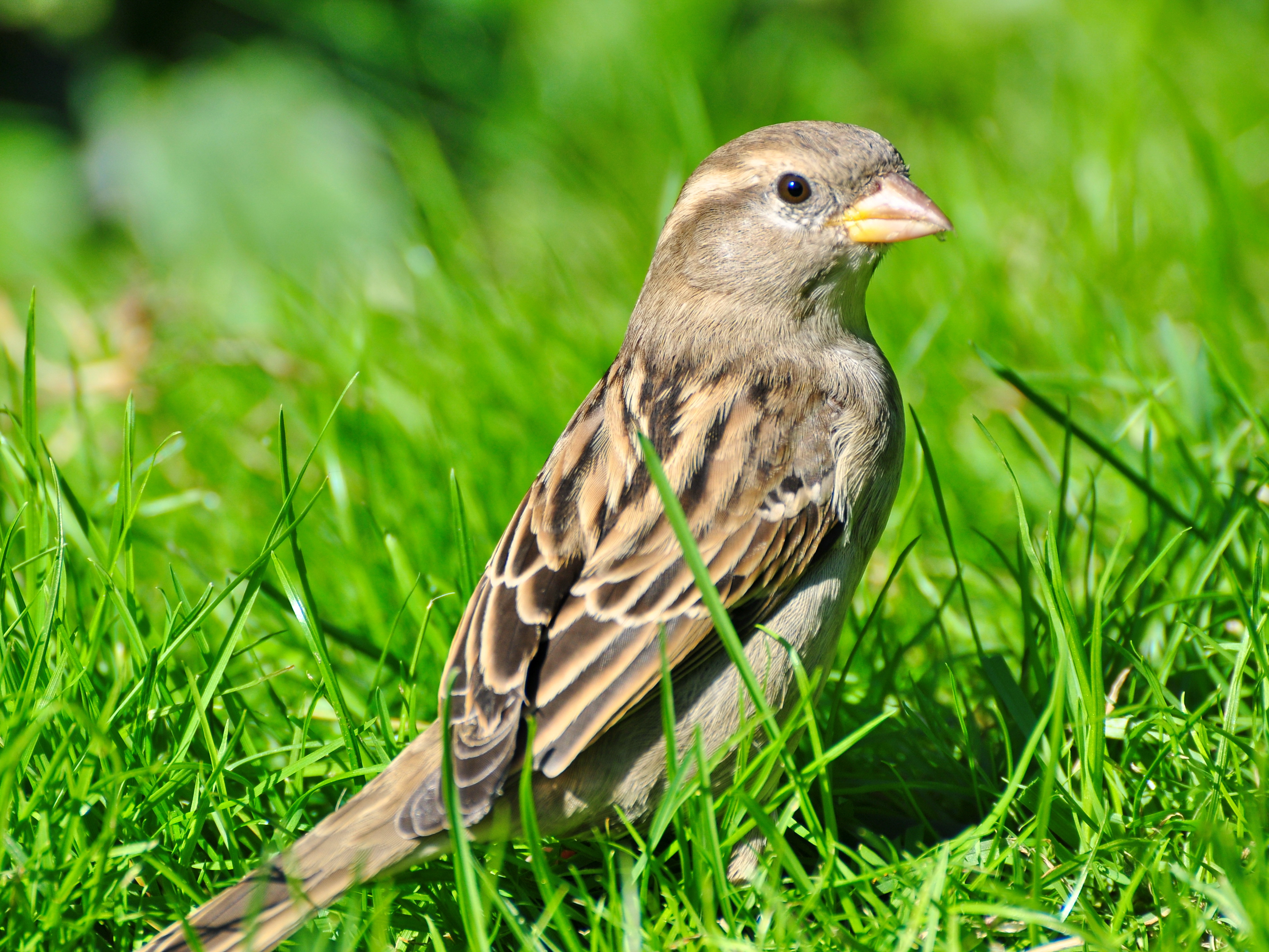

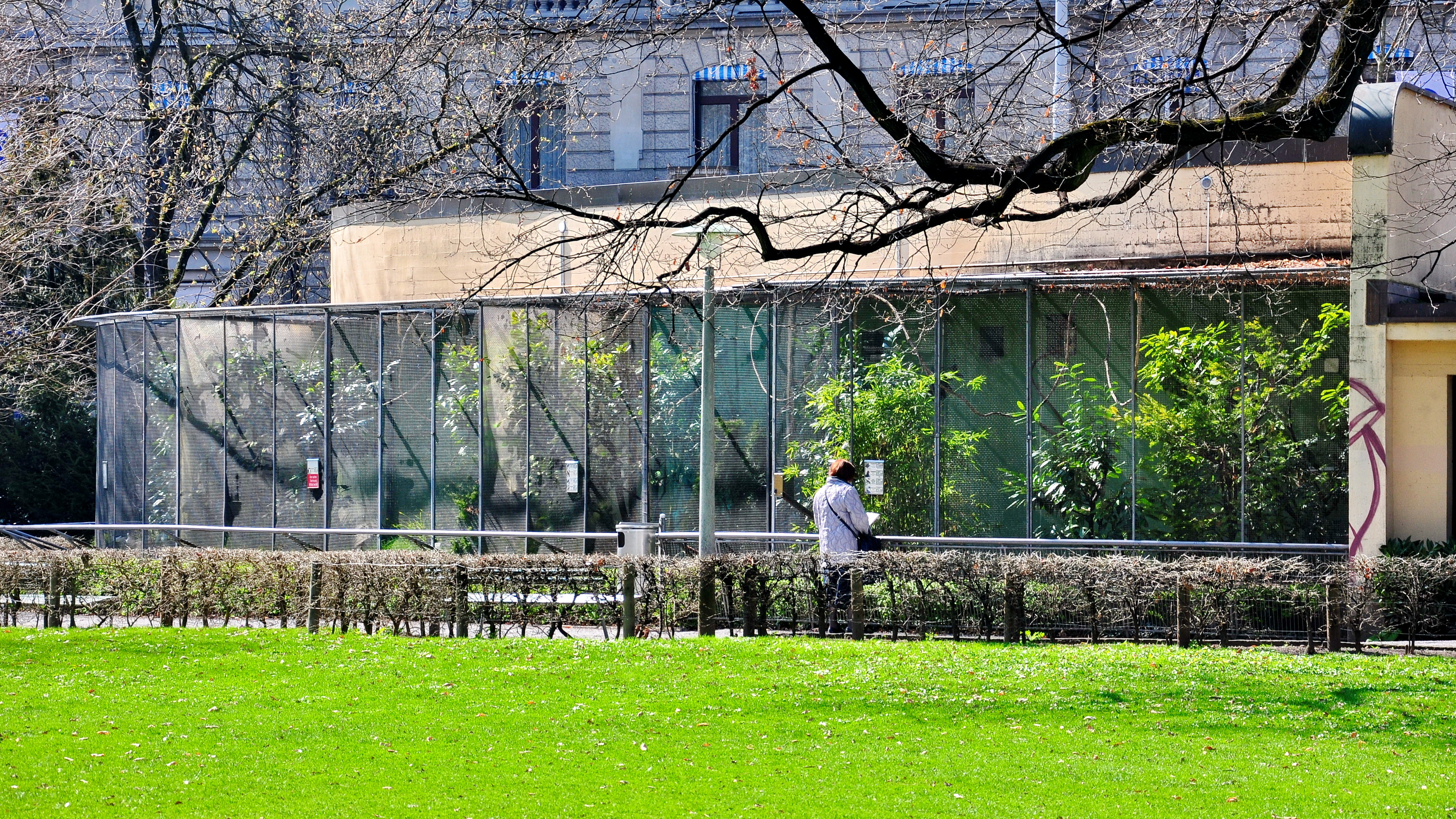

The aviary is situated at the Arboretum in Enge (Zurich) on the shore of Lake Zurich, being a part of the so-called Quaianlagen. It is separated by the General-Guisan-Quai and Mythenquai roads respectively the Arboretum from the lower lake shore promenade and the Enge harbour area.

Public transport is provided by the Zurich Tram route 5, as well as by the VBZ bus lines 161 and 165 at the Rentenanstalt stop.

== History ==
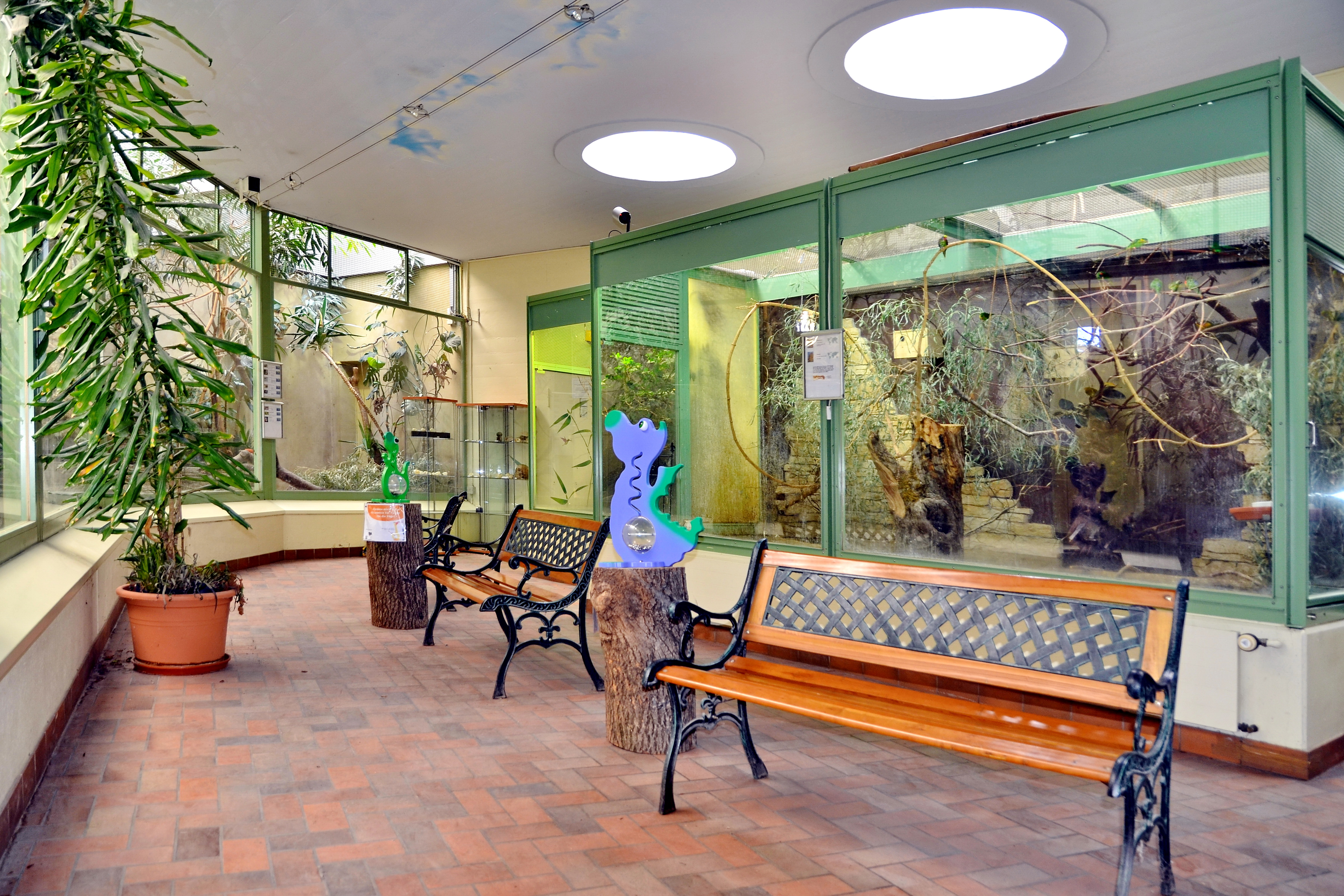
Public area of the bird care center

The so-called Vogelpflegestation, meaning a veterinary hospital respectively a sanatorium for birds, claims to be the most important emergency department in Switzerland for injured and sick wild birds, and also young birds that were fallen from their nest. Established in 1902, it is focused on bird rescue and information centre for the population, as well as a competence center for native and exotic birds that are emerged. The aviary has experienced financial issues since the city of Zürich ceased their support for the facility in 2000. The foundation is financed by contributions from members of its donor organization, Voliere-Gesellschaft Zürich. Staffing issues, as well as a higher-than-usual number of birds at the facility, are a factor in the financial situation.

== Aims ==
The aviary and the bird care station have a reputation which goes far beyond the Swiss borders. For tourists, in particular for ornithologists, it is a very attractive destination due to its unique portfolio of exotic birds. But also the citizens of Zürich use the wheelchair visitor hall of the aviary to expand their knowledge of the world of birds, of which approximately 111 exotics in 33 species are represented. Each year around 45,000 visitors ask for free information of some of the rarest bird species of Switzerland, housed at eight naturally designed inn walks and three landscape-like outdoor enclosures.

The three main tasks of the institution include the continuous improvement of the bird care station, the free educational work especially to the youth about the nature and animal welfare, but in particular the protection of birds, and obtaining the auspicious bird board.

== Services ==
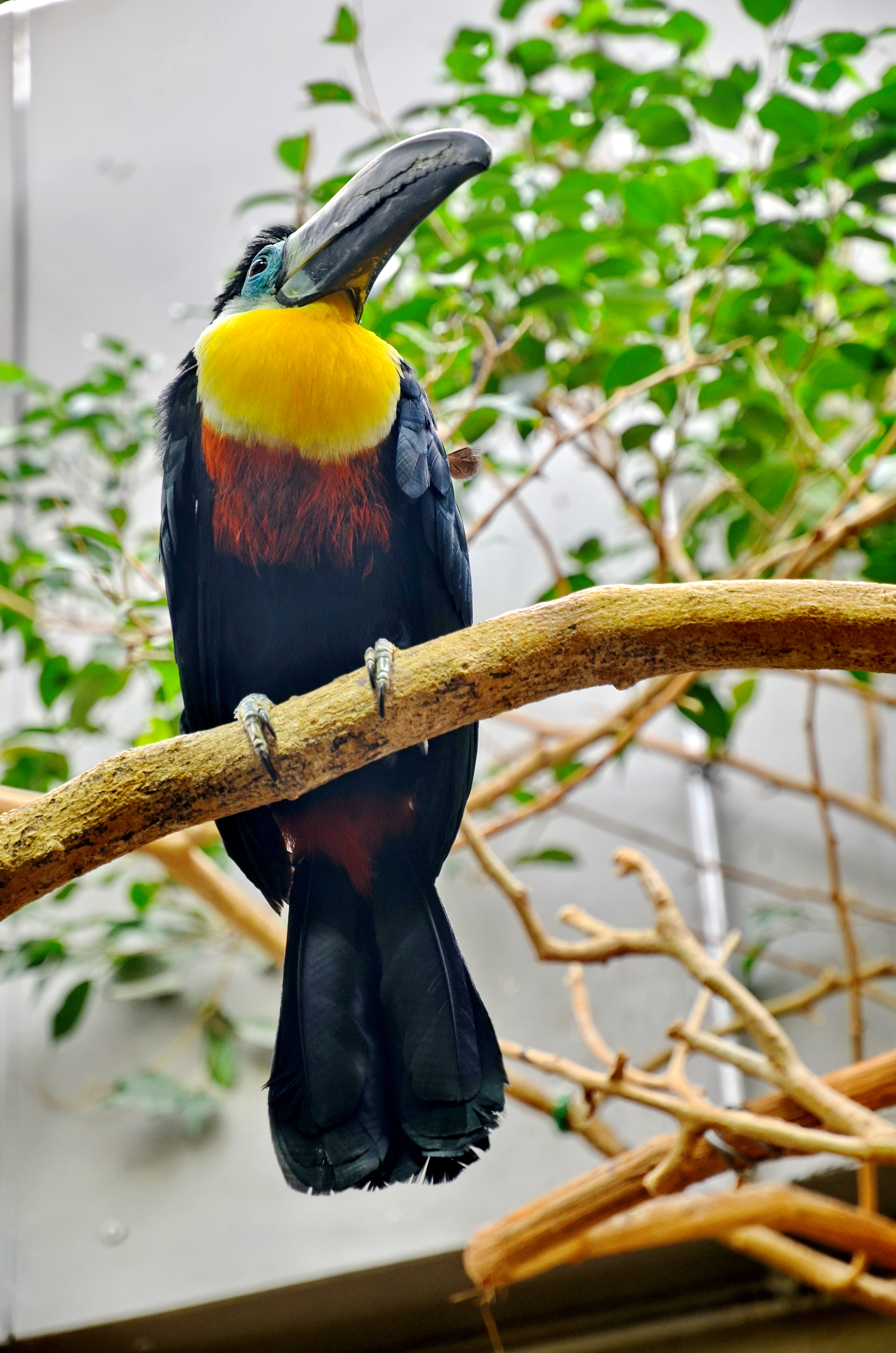
One of the winter guests

The aviary also provides unique services to the population. It houses the bird nursing station HelpBird, claiming to be the busiest in Switzerland. It also offers free help, including ornithology education for schools, hands on educational activities, an information service via phone and mail, and special exhibitions. In addition as a paid service there is a bird aviary boarding facility used by around 300 birds from over 200 owners.

== Bird care center ==
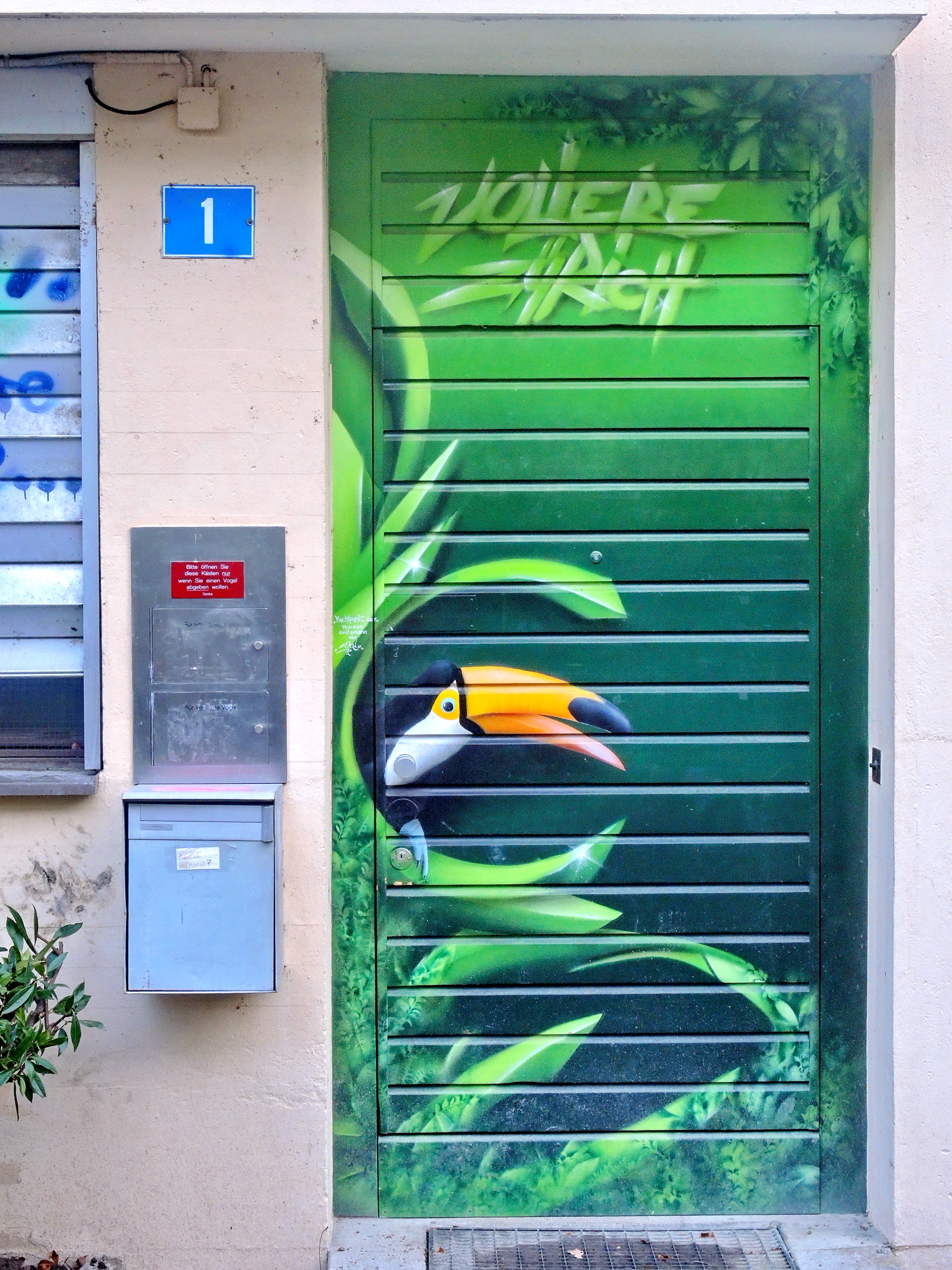
bird 'emergency boxes'

The bird care center (German: Vogelpflegestation) is the main reception center in Switzerland for sick, injured or wild birds fallen out of their nests. As the aviary itself, it is staffed 365 days a year and takes care, every day from 10:00 (10 am) to 12:00 (12 am) and from 14:00 (2 pm) to 16:00 (4 pm), feathered emergency patients. Outside the opening times the wild birds may delivered in two special "bird boxes" at the entrance.

In the largest sanatory for wild birds in Switzerland, only two people are employed for feeding and cleaning of the cages and enclosures, procurement of fodder, for advice and support of inquiries, looking for places for breeding birds and so one. We are literally overrun, and so the two employees had daily at 06:30 to feed the birds and specially catered young birds also at sunset. The long worktime in spring is directly related to the dramatic increase in sick and injured wild birds, of which 68% in 2010 were young birds that are fallen from the nest. People have been aware ... when they discover young birds, they call the police or animal rescue service which bring the birds to us. Absolute bustle prevails in the months of May to August, when the list of the animal patients is led by Mallards (300), followed by House Sparrows (107) Blackbirds (93) feral Pigeons (82), Crows (65), Swifts (55), Blue Tits (30), and many other, partly very rare species. Of the total of 1,150 wild birds, 45% have been saved.

1,579 wild birds of 70 species have been cared in 2012, about 20% more than in the year before, of which 55.4% were released back into the wild. In the same period 64 breeding birds of different species have been introduced. Thus, the number of the submitted breeding birds rose again to 64.1%, for all birds there were found within a year good places for further care, as well for 154 'exotics'. The purveyors of exotic, wild and farmed birds include people from the city of Zürich and its metropolitan area, as well as from all over Switzerland, including the Zürich fire department and government services, the police services, the animal hospital of Zürich and the veterinary services of the Canton of Zürich.

== Literature ==
- Gartenbiografien: Orte erzählen. vdf Hochschulverlag AG, ETH Zürich, Zürich 2013, ISBN 978-3-7281-3579-7.
