= Frauenbad Stadthausquai =

Public bath in Zurich, Switzerland

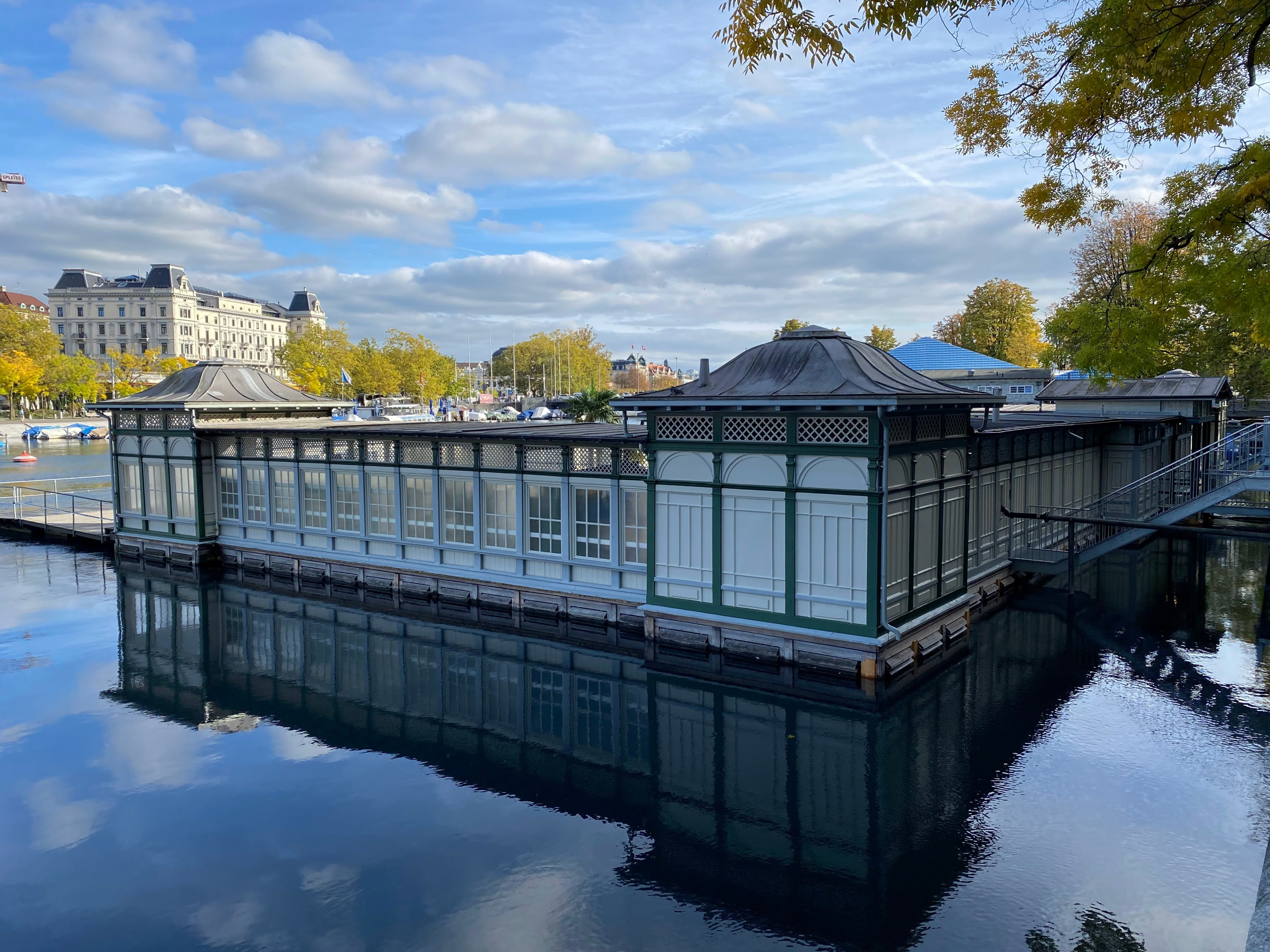
- Frauenbad at Stadthausquai as seen from Stadthausquai.
- Interactive map of Frauenbad Stadthausquai
- Former names: Frauenbad(i)
- Location: Stadthausquai 12, Zürich, CH-8001
- Coordinates: 47.368183°N 8.54194°E
- Operator: City of Zürich
- Type: public bath; river bath; women's bath
- Facilities: gym, crèche, kiosk, swimming pool
- Dimensions: Length: about 40 metres (131 ft); Width: about 30 metres (98 ft); Depth: 4 metres (13 ft)

Construction
- Opened: 1888

Website
- Official website (in German)

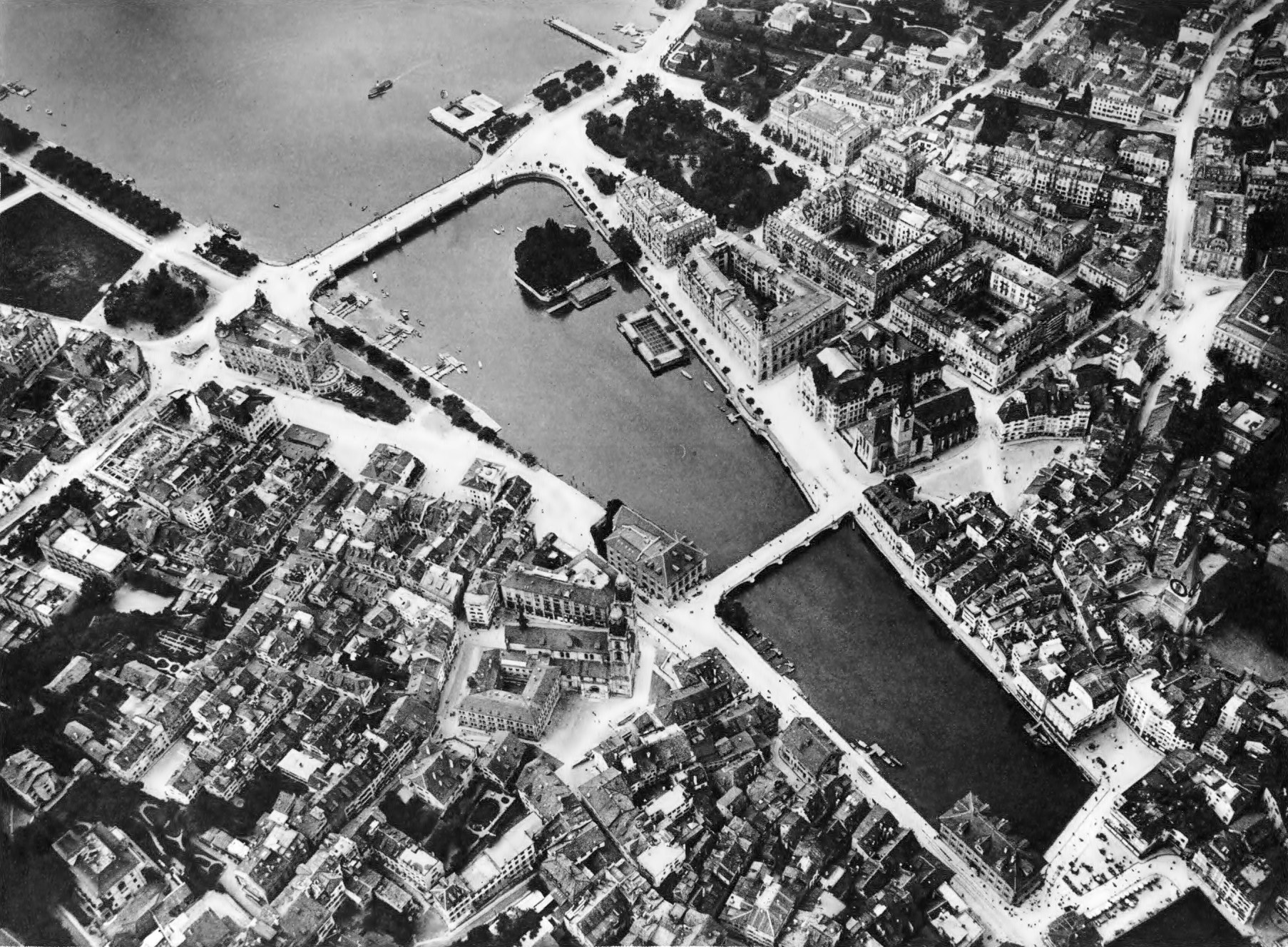
Limmatquai and Quaianlagen in Zürich: Bellevueplatz and Bürkliplatz, as well as Bauschänzli and Frauenbad, Quaibrücke, Münsterbrücke and Münsterhof, and Rathausbrücke–Weinplatz, aerial photography by Eduard Spelterini probably in the mid-1890s.

Frauenbad Stadthausquai is a public bath in Zürich, Switzerland, forming part of the historical Seeuferanlage promenades that were built between 1881 and 1887. Situated at the Stadthausquai by the Bürkliplatz plaza, the bath was built for, and is still exclusively used by women (Frauenbad means "bath for women").

== Geography ==
The small river bath is situated at Bürkliplatz below the Quaibrücke, just north of the artificial Bauschänzli island, in the Limmat. Road transport on Stadthausquai towards Münsterhof is limited; the next tram stop is at Bürkliplatz or Münsterbrücke, opposite of the upper Limmatquai towards Bellevueplatz.

== History and description ==
Zürich's government decided in 1837 to build a public bath for women, so that "they are no longer forced to bath at night in the fountains" and to protect them from the eyes of men. The former structure at the Bauschänzli was replaced in 1888 by the nostalgic Laubsägeli (literally: fretsaw) bath, named for its oriental curved corner turrets. The interior was covered in the early years with a braided roof as a sun shade. Moored on the river Limmat, the small wooden bath is well arranged and is open only to women, except for special events. In the 34 metres (112 ft) pool is a non-swimming section. Free swimming in the Limmat is prohibited.

== Cultural Heritage ==
The structure is listed in the Swiss inventory of cultural property of national and regional significance as a Class A object of national importance.

== See also ==
- Bauschänzli
- Bürkliplatz
- Quaianlagen
