= Bauschänzli =

Artificial island in Zürich, Switzerland

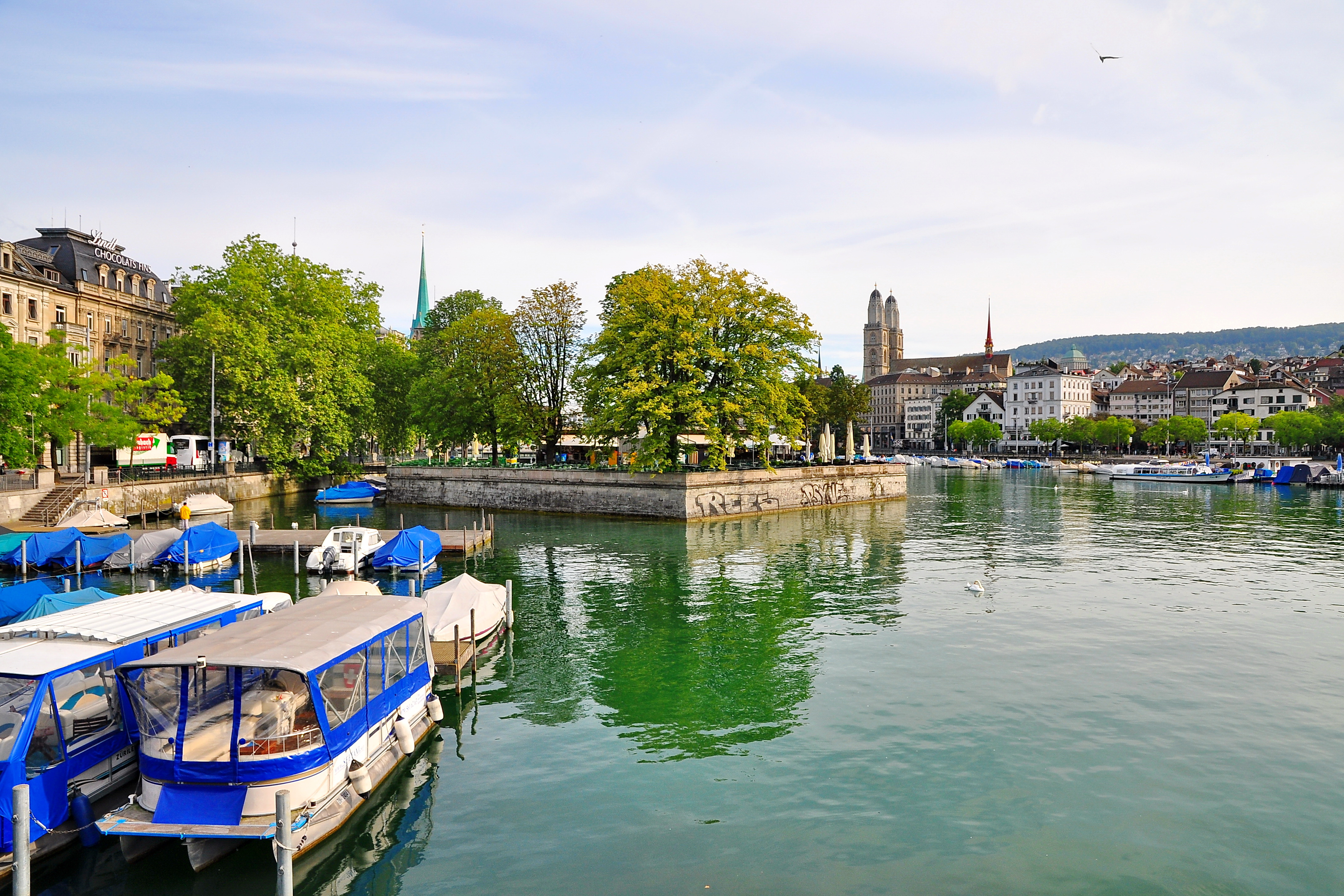
- Bauschänzli as seen from Bürkliplatz towards Limmatquai and Grossmünster
- Interactive map of Bauschänzli
- 47°22′3.65″N 8°32′32.65″E
- Location: Stadthausquai respectively Limmat in Zürich

History
- Built: 1662

Site notes
- Architectural style: European Medieval
- Governing body: City of Zürich

Bauschänzli is an artificial island, town square, and public park in Zürich, Switzerland. Bauschänzli (diminutive of "construction entrenchment") is one of the last remains of the Baroque fortifications of Zürich which began in 1642. The neighboring Schanzengraben (moat) and the Old Botanical Garden are part of these remains. Since 1907, the island has been used as a restaurant, although it is officially a public square and park.

== Geography ==
Bauschänzli is situated in the historical Alpenquai district on the artificial island. It is on the western shore of Limmat, off Bürkliplatz at the Stadthausquai road and opposite Bellevueplatz. A tiny public park can be found here.

== Points of interests ==
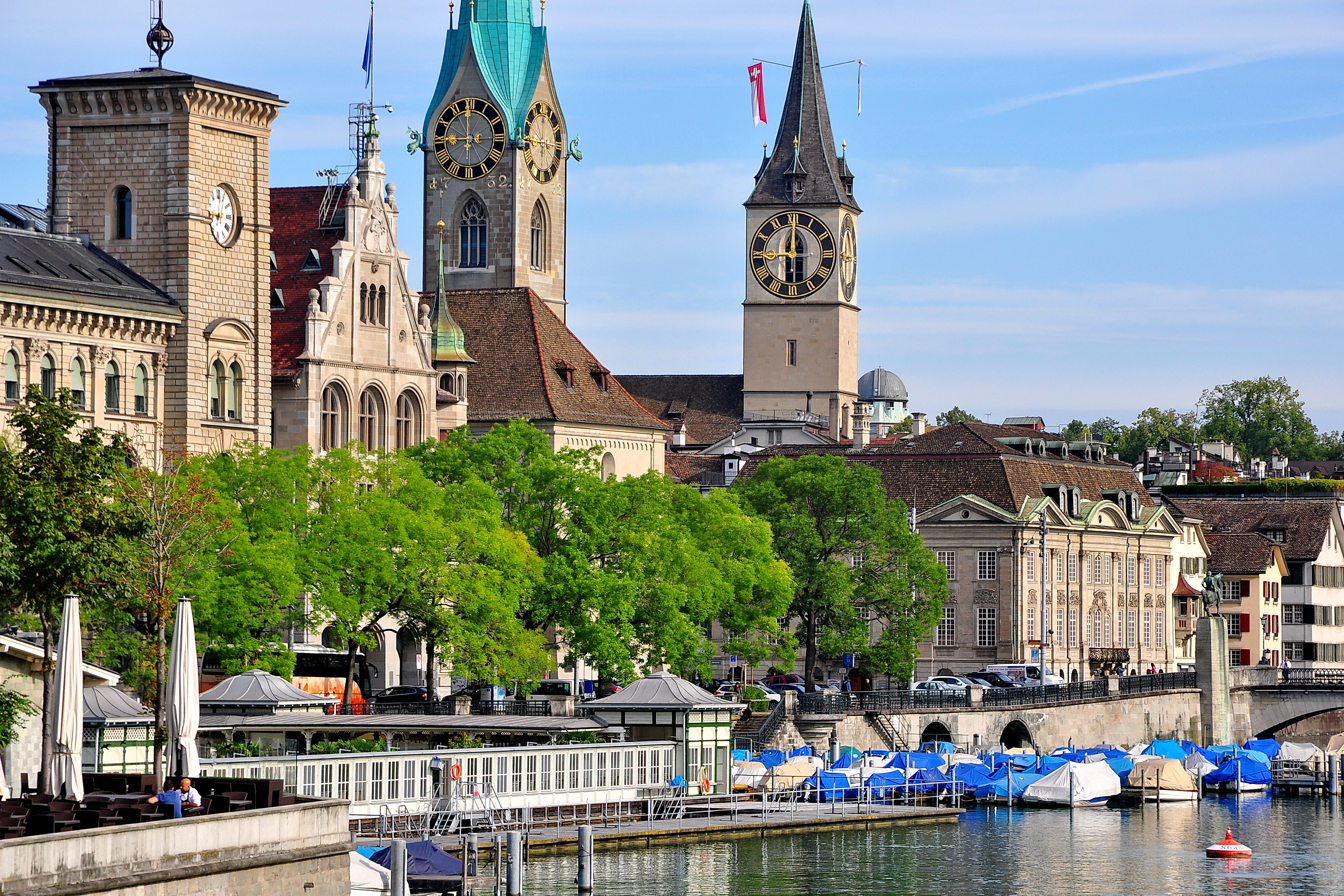
Stadthausquai towards Münsterhof, Frauenbadi lido in the foreground, Zunfthaus zur Meisen and Lindenhof in the background

In addition to the Seeuferanlage and its neighboring Uto and General Guisan quays, the Zürich Arboretum and the Zürich Aviary are nearby. The aviary houses the Vogelpflegestation, a unique sanctuary for birds. Other attractions include the historical Lindenhof quarter downstream on the Limmat.

Today the small park is dominated by the Bauschänzli restaurant, claiming to be the largest beer garden outside the Munich Octoberfest. The area is illuminated by the Plan Lumière of the city government of Zurich. In December, the area is home to the Circus Conelli, the only event periodically held on the small island.

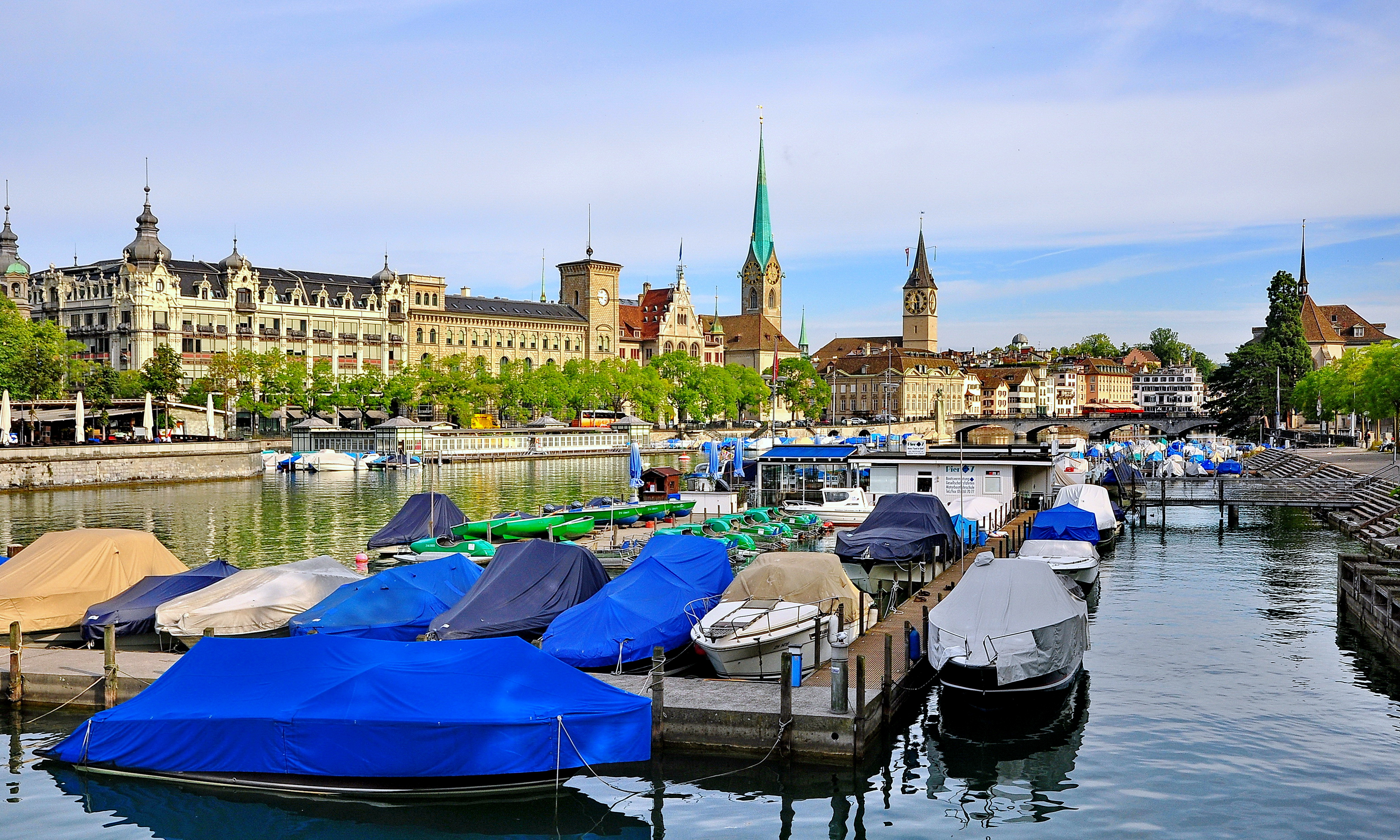
Limmat effluence downstream Lindenhof and the historical Turicum

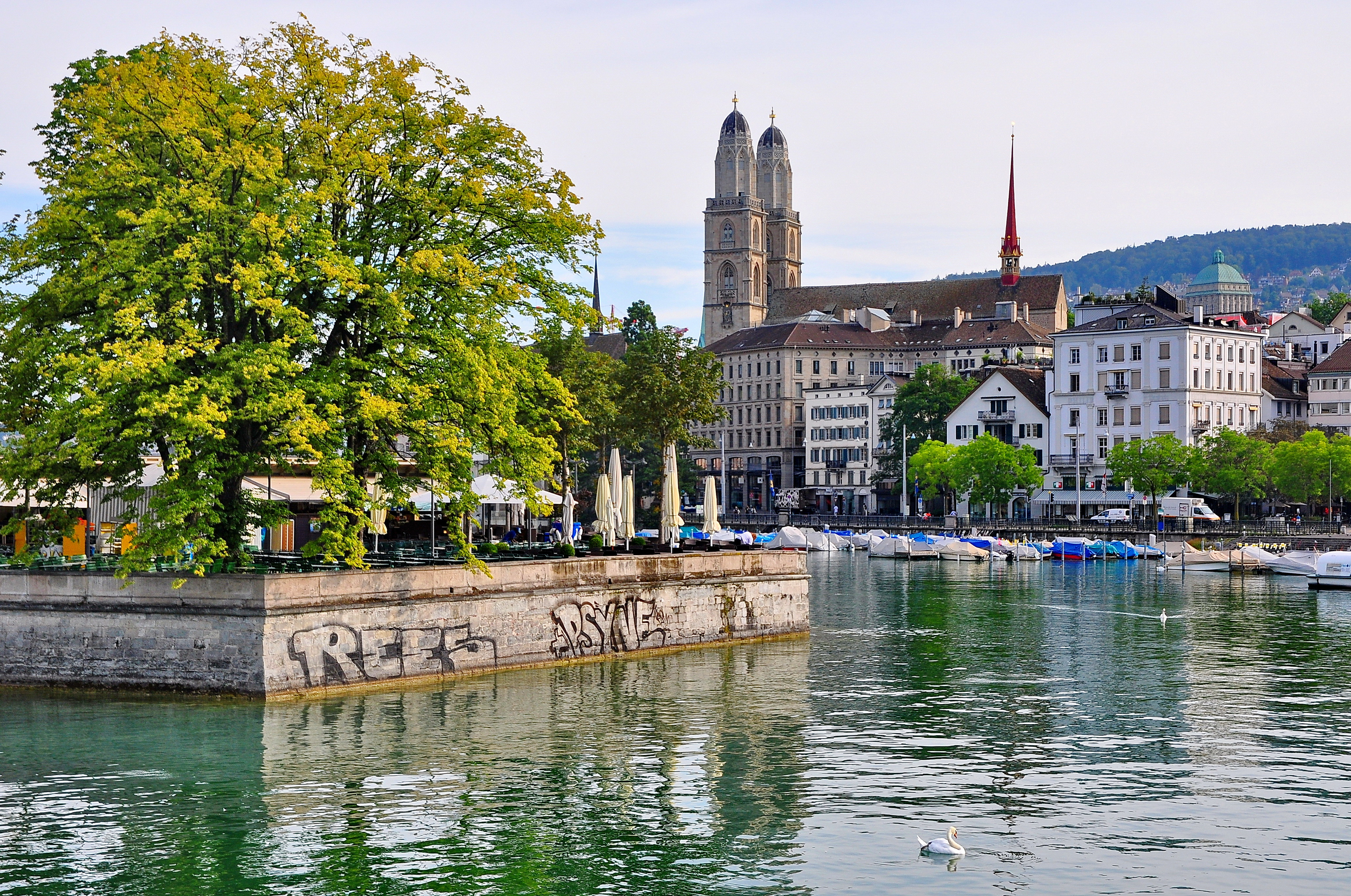

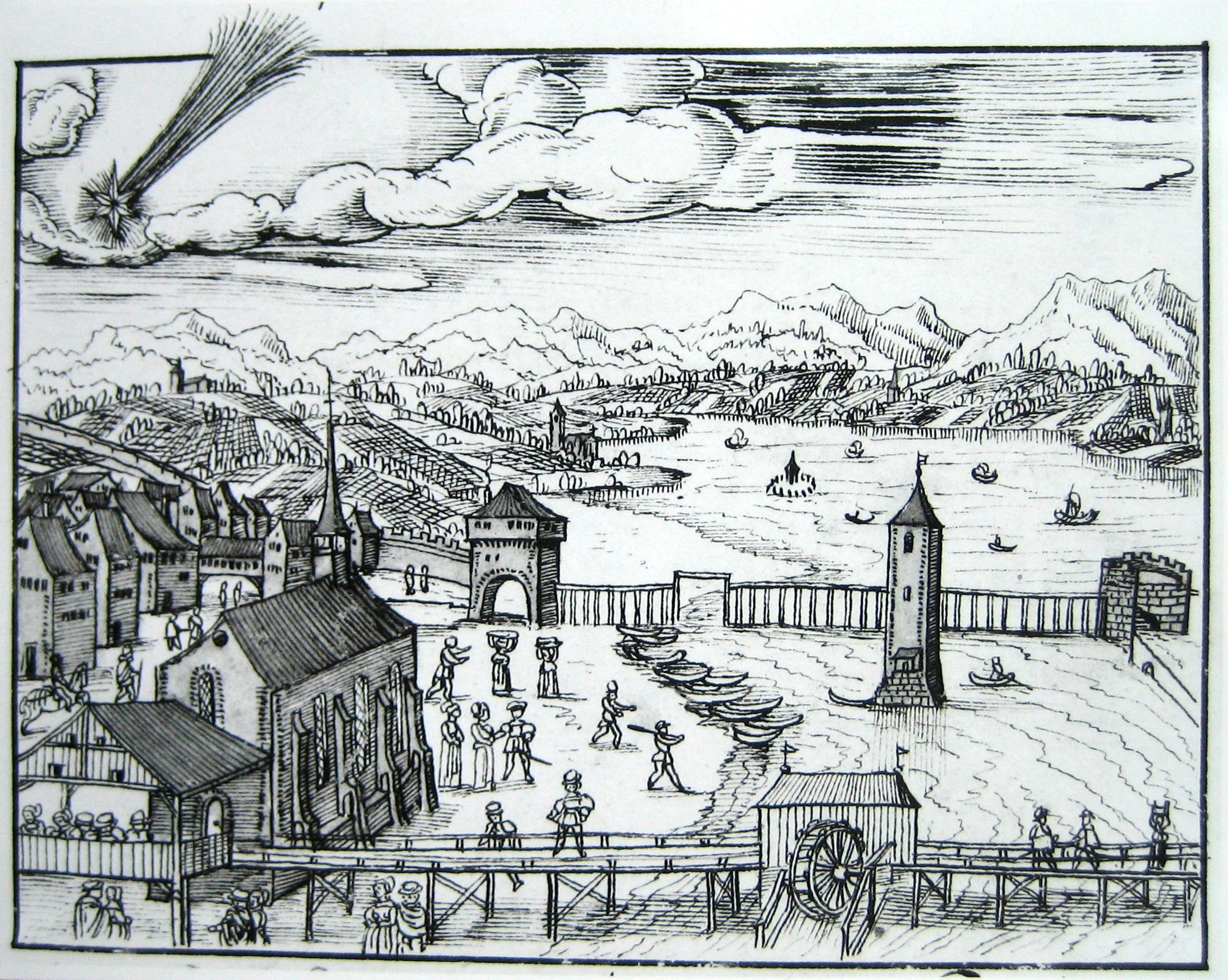
The area towards the lake and Grosser Hafner island, showing the then neighboring Grendeltor about the 1570s

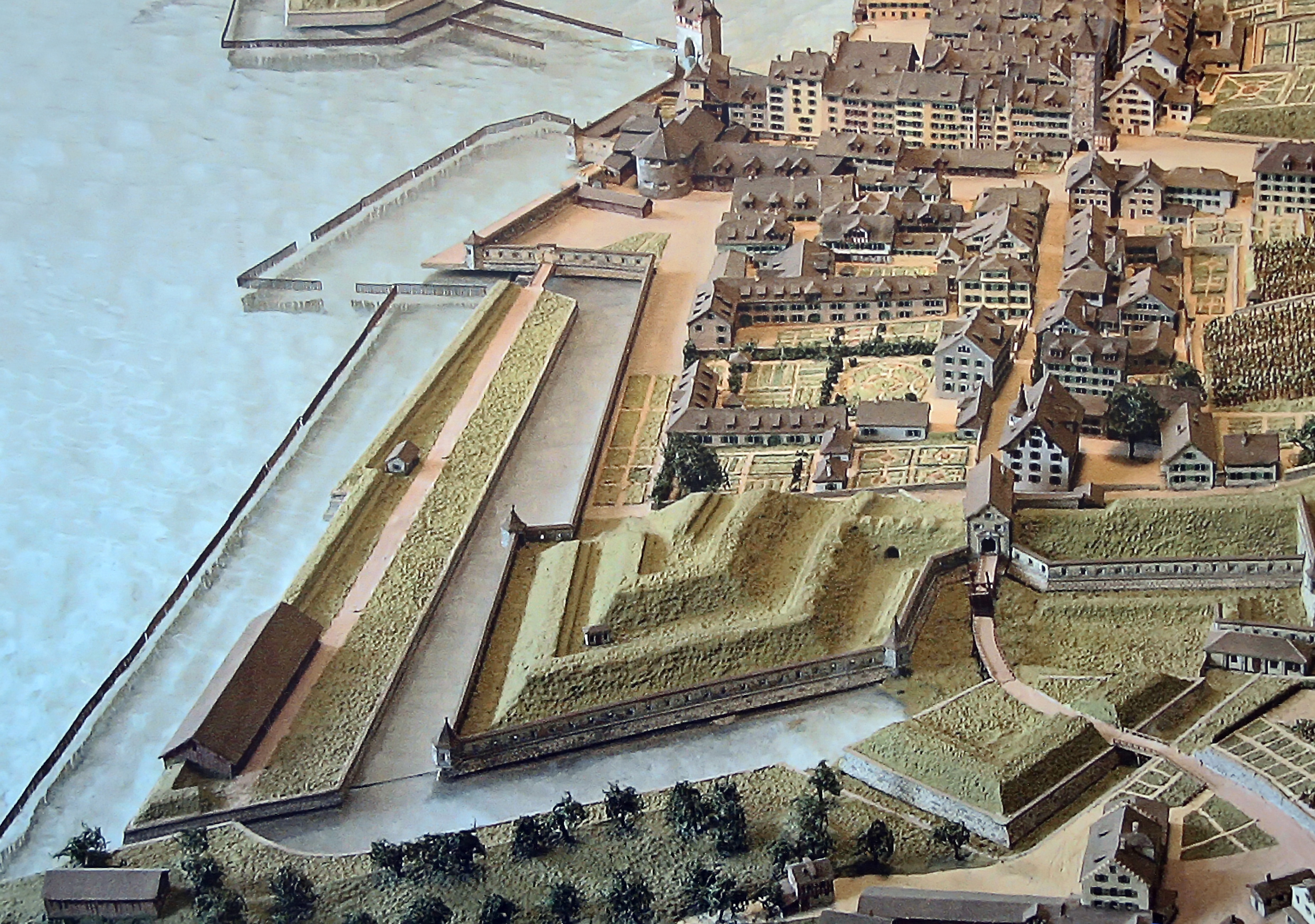
Scale model of the late medieval city, Baugeschichliches Archive, Neumarkt, Zürich

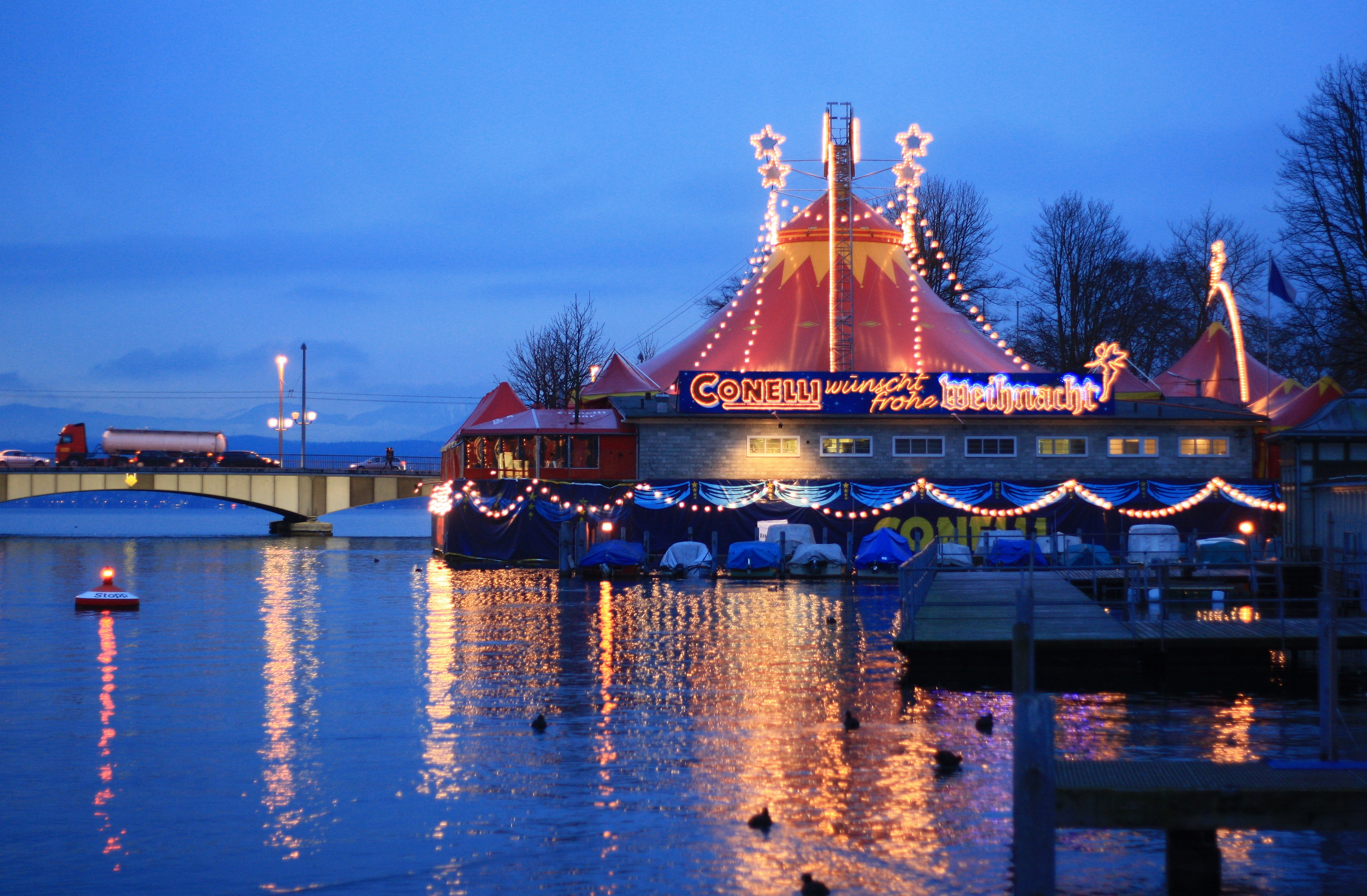
Circus Conelli in December

== History ==
=== Prehistory ===
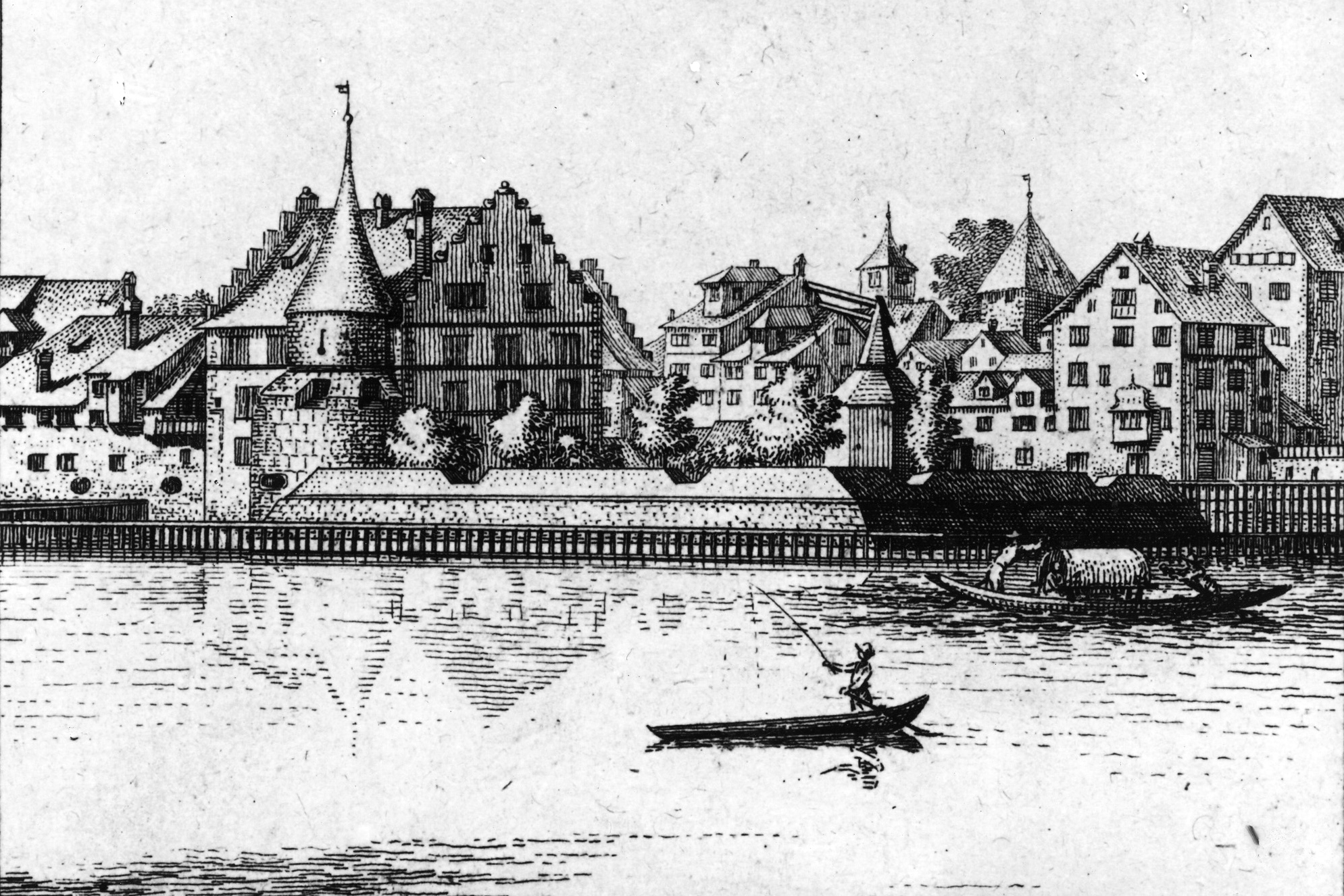
Drawing by Johann Balthasar Bullinger showing the bulwark in 1770.

The area between Limmat and Lake Zurich around Sechseläutzenplatz and on the small islands and peninsulas in Zürich was once swampland. Prehistoric pile dwellings around Zürichsee were set on piles to protect against occasional flooding by the Linth and Jona. Alpenquai is located on the Lake Zurich shore in Enge, a locality of the municipality of Zürich. It was neighbored by the settlements at Kleiner Hafner and Grosser Hafner, on what was then a peninsula (now an island) in the effluence of the Limmat. It was an area of about 0.2 square kilometres (49.42 acres) within the city of Zürich. As well as being part of the 56 Swiss sites of the UNESCO World Heritage Site Prehistoric pile dwellings around the Alps, the settlements are listed in the Swiss inventory of cultural property of national and regional significance as a Class object. Despite the dredging for the construction of the Seequai between 1916 and 1919, an area of approximately 2.8 hectares (7 acres) with two cultural layers was preserved around Bauschänzli. Pile shoes at different altitudes in the cultural layers were found and rich bar decoration of ceramics occurred exclusively in the lower layer. The decoration on the cannelure groups was limited to the upper layer, with some graphite-decorated fragments.

=== Grendeltor ===
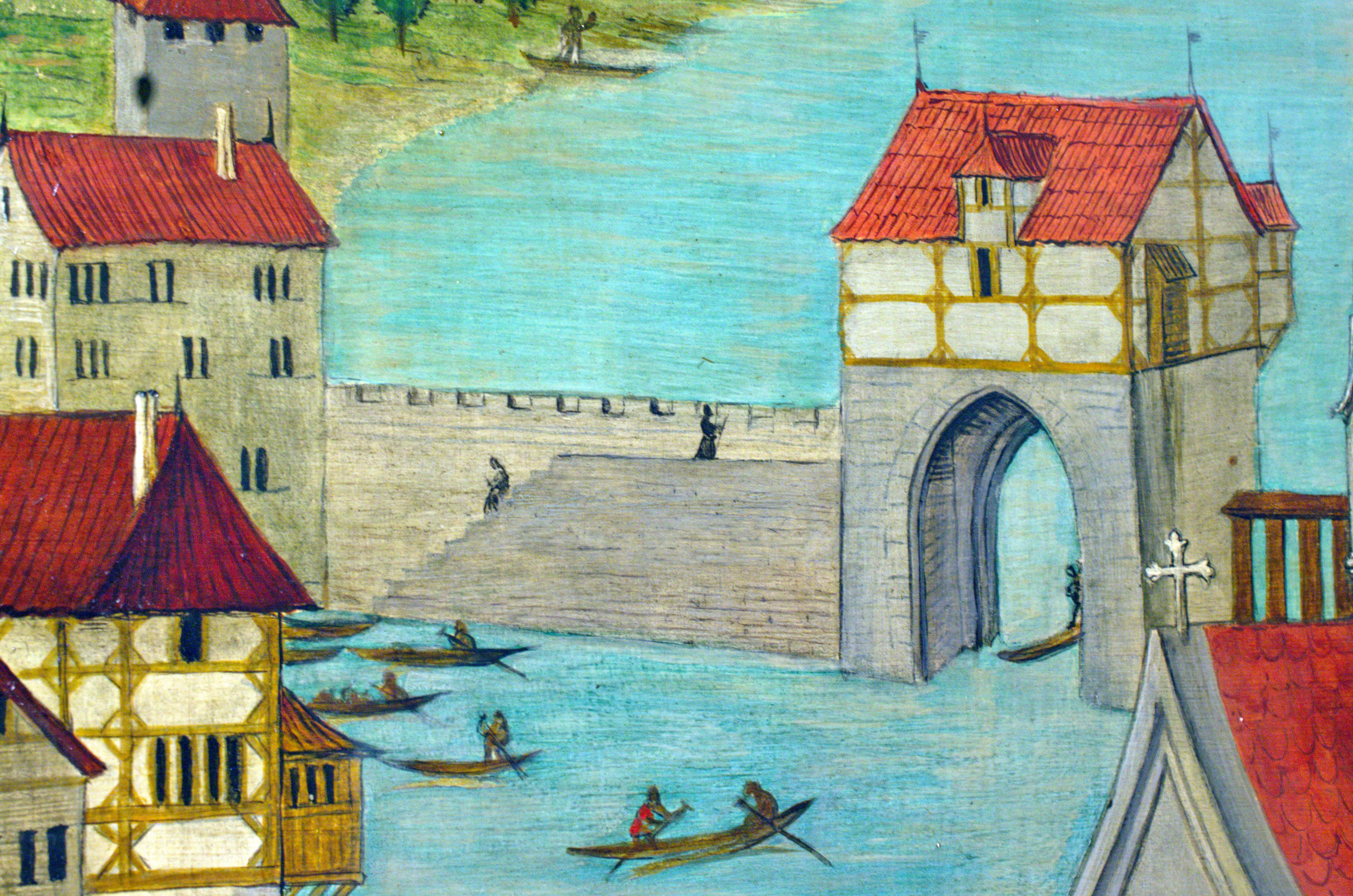
Grendeltor by Hans Leu at the end of the 15th century AD

Grendeltor (or colloquially Grendel) was the only water gate in medieval Zürich. It served as an additional lakeside fortification towards the present Stadelhoferplatz. The gate served as a transit for vessel traffic between the Limmat and Lake Zurich. It was the only water gate in Zürich and stood on the east bank of the Limmat where Haus Bellevue is today, opposite the Bauschänzli bastion. It was enforced by a double row of palisades. In an assignment list of about 1489 AD, two riflemen, "uff the hutten", were mentioned, probably meaning the Grendeltor. The gate tower was also built as a customs station for goods that were transported on the waterway to the civilian Schifflände harbor. The medieval military harbor was situated at the present Sechseläutenplatz. In 1578, 'the alert to the buzz uff the huts' had to be guaranteed at day and night. The Grendeltor was broken in the mid-19th century.

=== Modern history ===
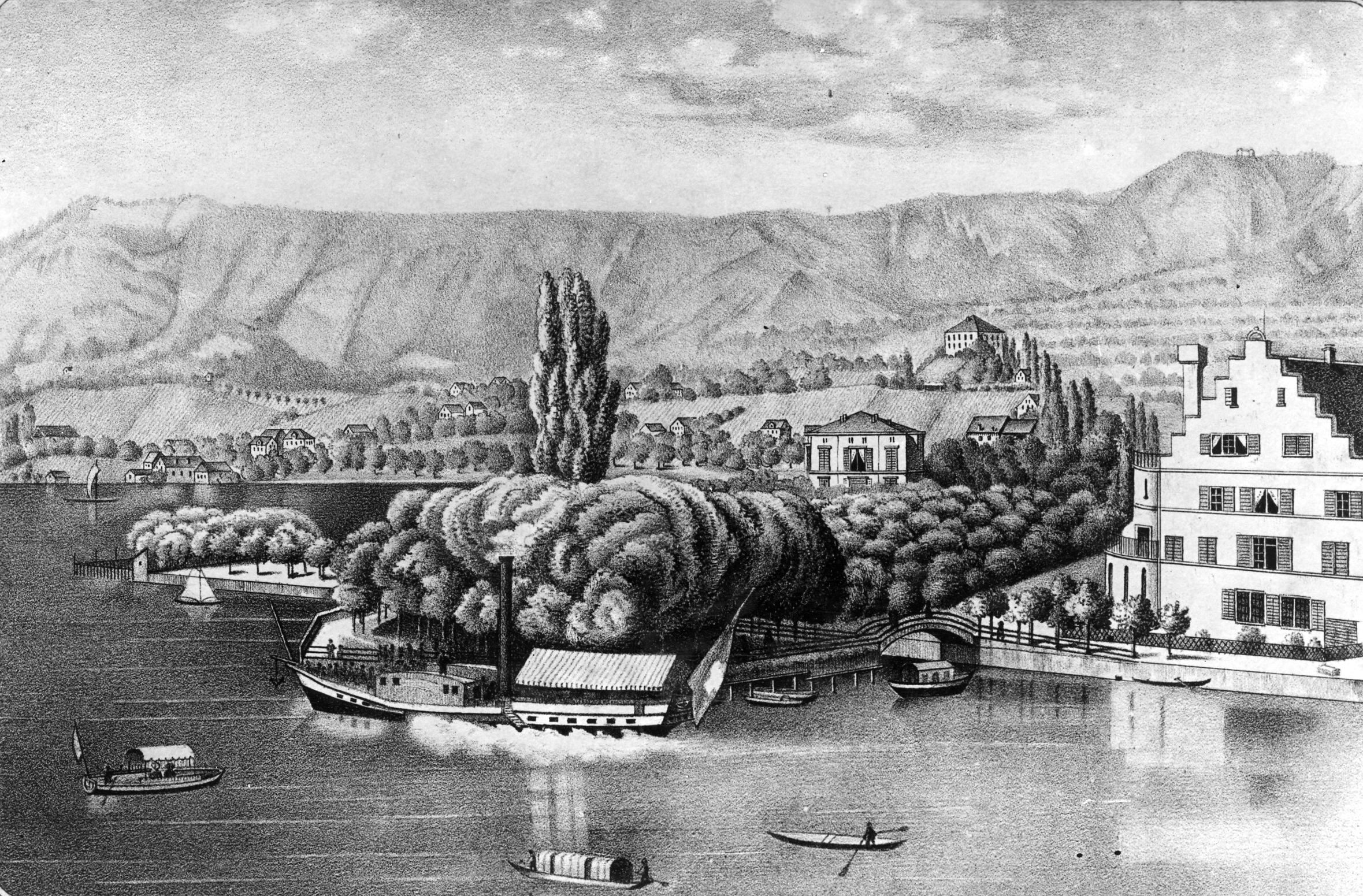
Zürichsee-Schifffahrtsgesellschaft (ZSG) landing gate probably in the 1850s

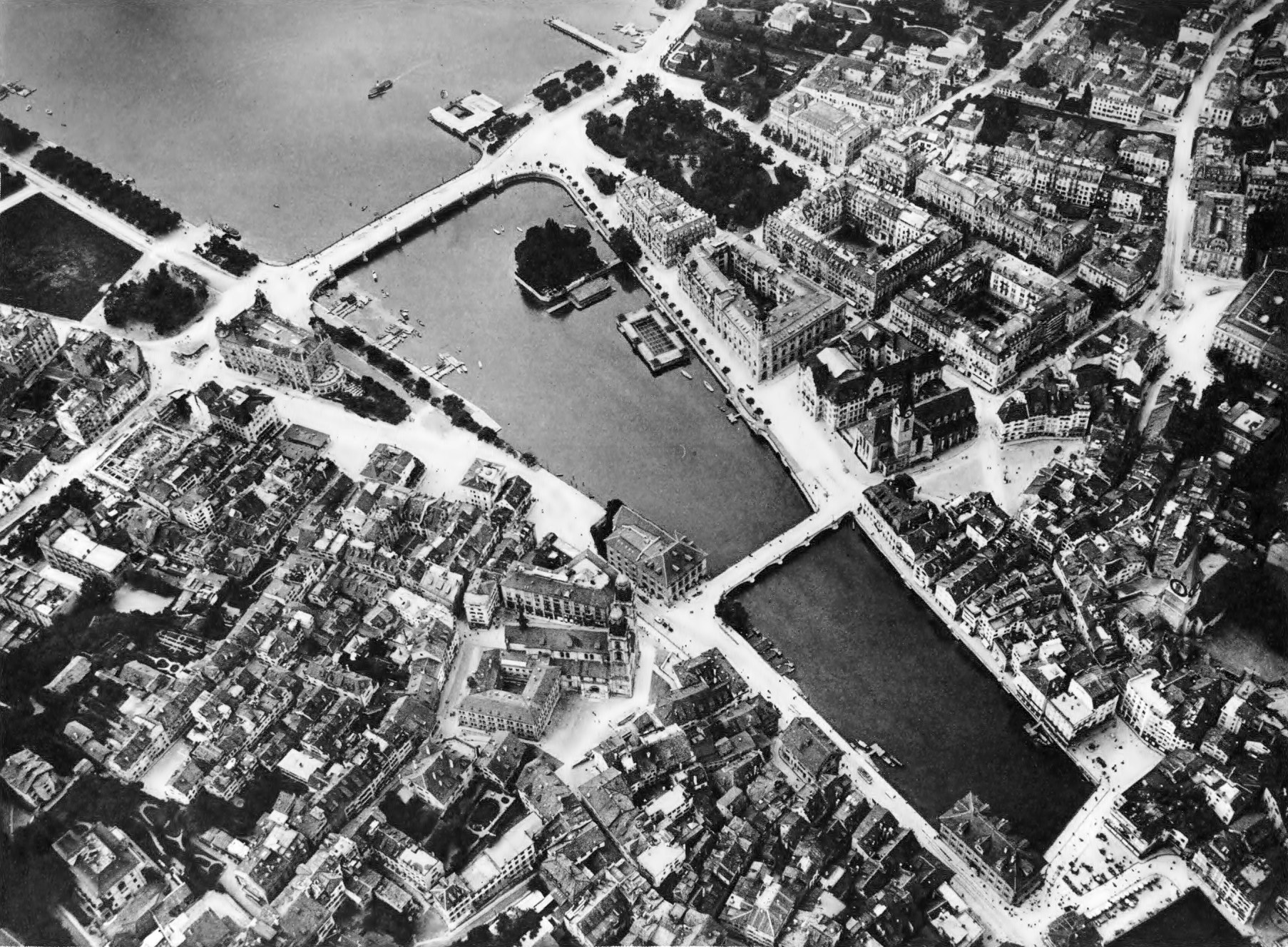
Limmatquai and Quaianlagen: Bellevueplatz and Bürkliplatz, Quaibrücke, Münsterbrücke and Münsterhof, and Rathausbrücke–Weinplatz, aerial photography by Eduard Spelterini probably in the mid-1890s.

The name Bauschänzli derives from the former building site Bauplatz Schanz, meaning "construction site at the Lair" or, literally, bastion. Later, it was popularly called Schänzlein im Wasser, situated in the historical Kratz quarter. It was built as a bulwark. A picket fence was built in the south on what was the shore of Lake Zurich, between 1657 and 1662 AD.

Today, Bauschänzli is reached from the west bank of the Limmat, at that time the site of the Bauhaus of the city's engineer, by a web-scraped drawbridge. As a southerly outpost, it served as a bastion to protect the city against naval attacks. On a shoal in the Limmat funnel, a small hill was built in 1660 to block access from the lake to the city. It was called Halbmond meaning "half moon", and was planted with trees. However, it was never threatened in the following years, and thus it was used primarily for public events. The Schwirren, lakeside palisades, were demolished in 1834/35 and its wall fortification in 1842. While the fortifications were abolished, the Bauschänzli bastion remained intact and served from 1835 to 1883 as the landing site for the first steamboats on the lake, later provided by the Zürichsee-Schifffahrtsgesellschaft (ZSG). For some years, it was the property of the Canton of Zürich but was sold back to the city in 1846, under the condition that it must remain open to the public as a public square. The Leutholdplan map of 1846 showed it as a public park with tall trees and huge pillars in its center. In 1907, the owner of the Metropol building at Stadthausquai was allowed to run a garden restaurant and a building was erected for the Biergarten and to house an electric lighting facility. The current economic building and the distinctive column-like poplar were erected in 1937. In 2001/2002, in addition to the renovation and expansion of the Herter-building, new trees were planted and replenished, and the urban Plan Lumière was implemented.

== Cultural heritage ==
Bauschänzli is listed in the Swiss inventory of cultural property of national and regional significance as a Class A object.

== See also ==
- Alpenquai
- Bürkliplatz
- List of islands of Switzerland
