= Zurich Town Hall =

Town hall in Zurich, Switzerland

Coordinates: 47°22′17″N 8°32′33″E

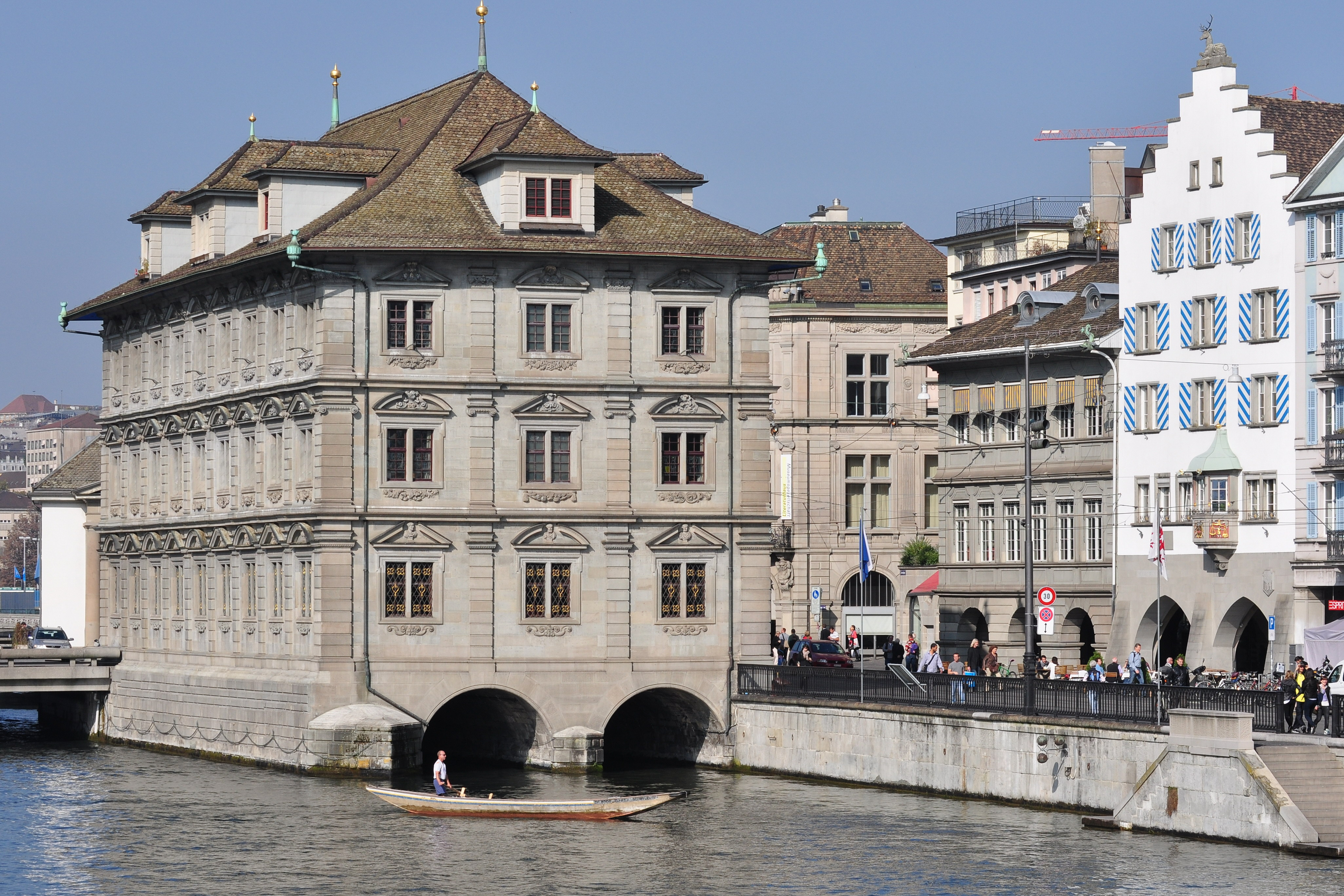
2010 photograph, south-western side, Zunfthaus zur Haue to the right

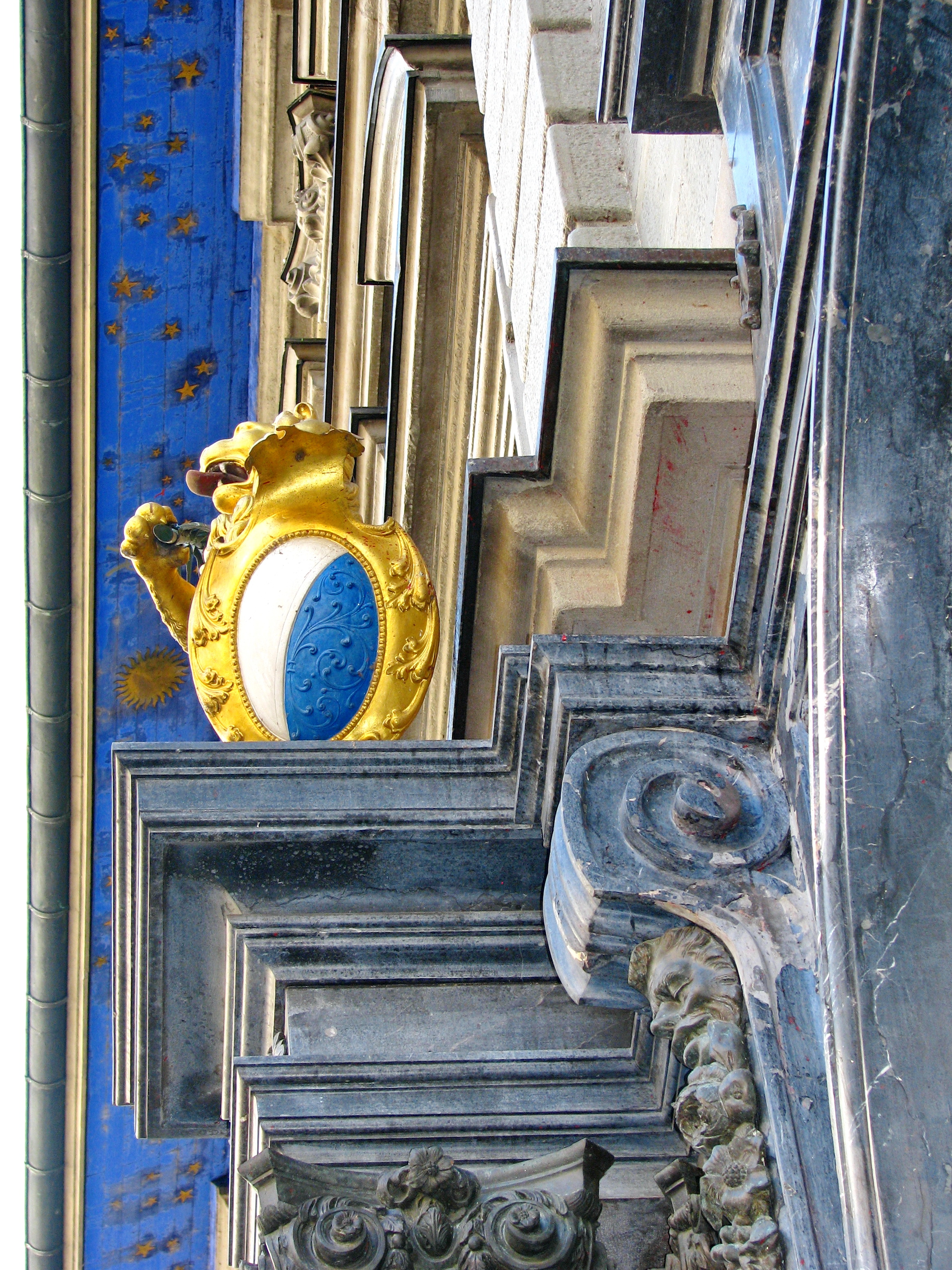
Portal and ceiling paintings with details of stucco and lion sculpture

The Rathaus in Zurich, Switzerland is Zurich's Town Hall. The Rathaus was built from 1694–1698. It served as the seat of government and administration of the Republic of Zurich until 1798. The canton of Zurich owns it since 1803, and it houses both legislative chambers, the cantonal parliament (German: Kantonsrat) as well as the City Parliament (German: Gemeinderat). It must be distinguished from the Stadthaus (City Hall), which is the seat of the city's executive government, the City Council (German: Stadtrat) and its administration.

== History ==
It is built on a fundament (foundation) anchored in the river Limmat and faces the Limmatquai (pedestrian area) at a pedestrian bridge, or the Rathausbrücke. The 17th-century building replaces an earlier Rathaus (city council chambers) built in 1397, which in turn replaced a 13th-century court house (Richthus).

Rathaus is also the name of a quarter within the Altstadt district. It is an integral part of the medieval town on the right side of the Limmat, separated by the Hirschengraben from the Hochschulen quarter uphill to the east, and delimited by the Bellevue and Central squares to the south and north, respectively.

== Literature ==
- Christian Renfer: Schweizerische Kunstführer GSK, Band 637/638: Das Rathaus in Zürich, Bern 1998, ISBN 3-85782-637-1
- Konrad Escher: Die Kunstdenkmäler des Kantons Zürich. Bd. IV: Die Stadt Zürich, Erster Teil. Birkhäuser: Basel 1939, S. 319–360.

== Gallery ==
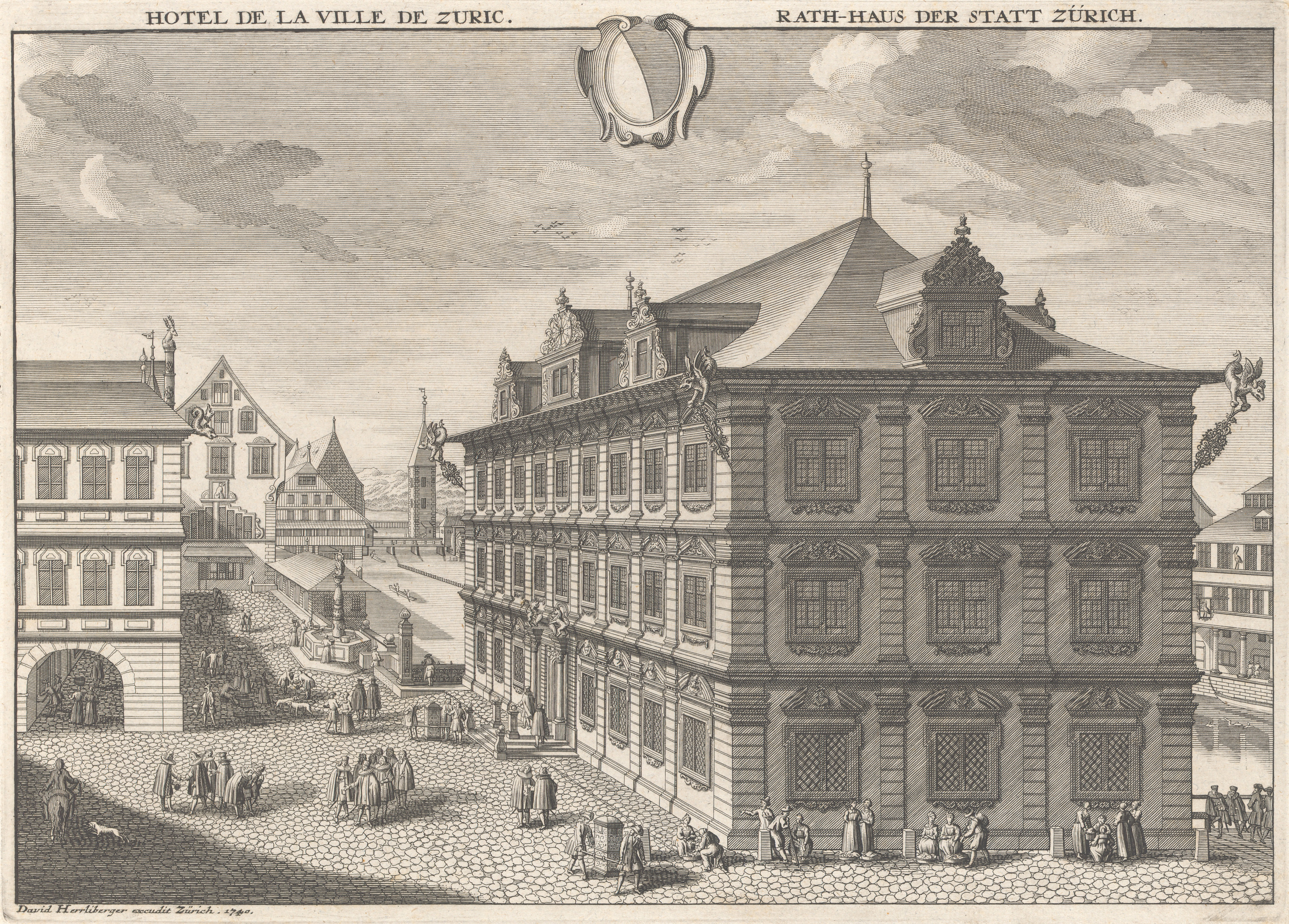
18th-century depiction, north-eastern side (etching by David Herrliberger, 1740)

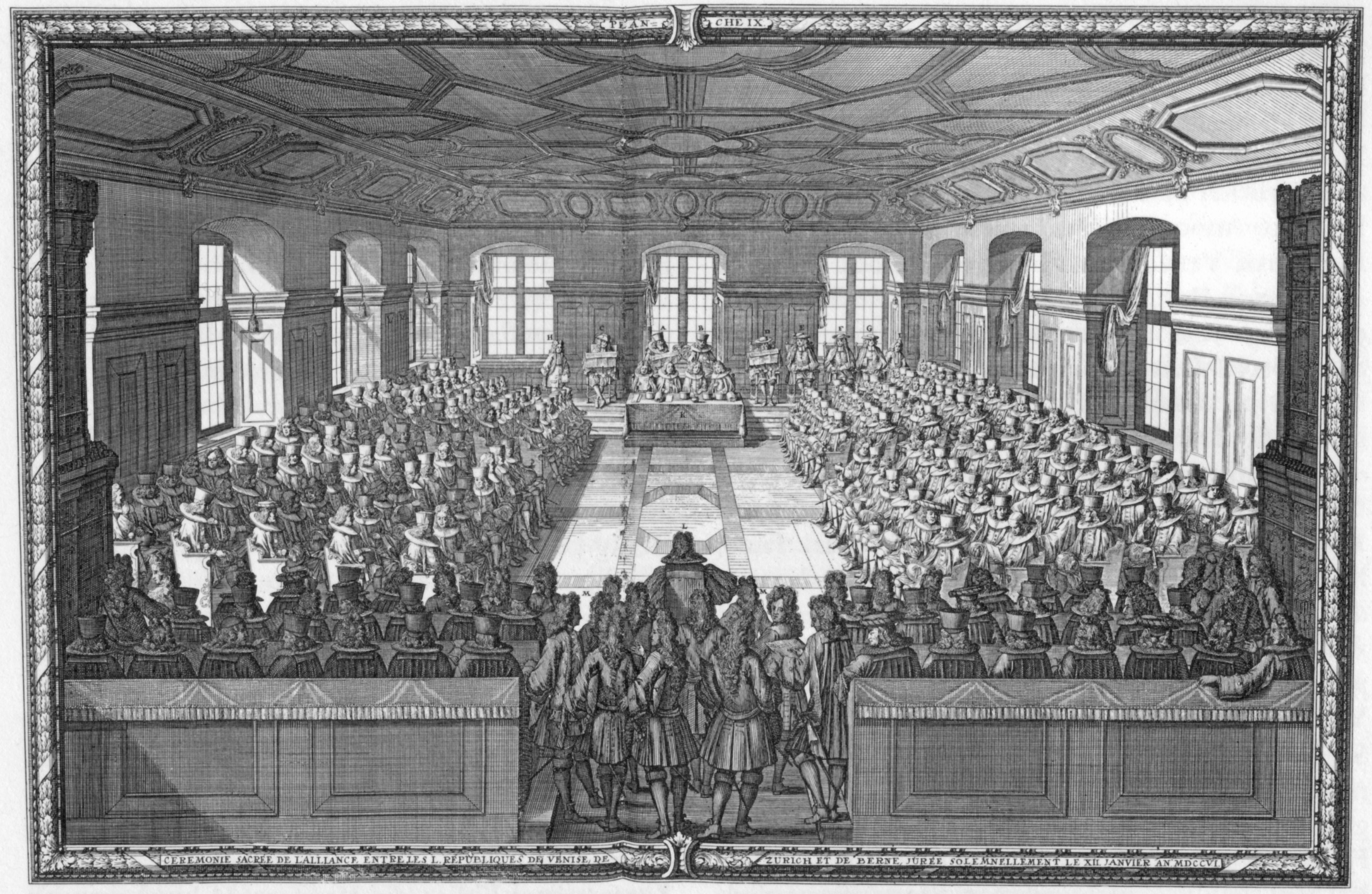
Depiction of the ceremony and conjuration of the alliance between the Republic of Venice and the Republics of Berne and Zurich on 22 January 1706 (copper engraving by Johann Melchior Füssli, 1718)

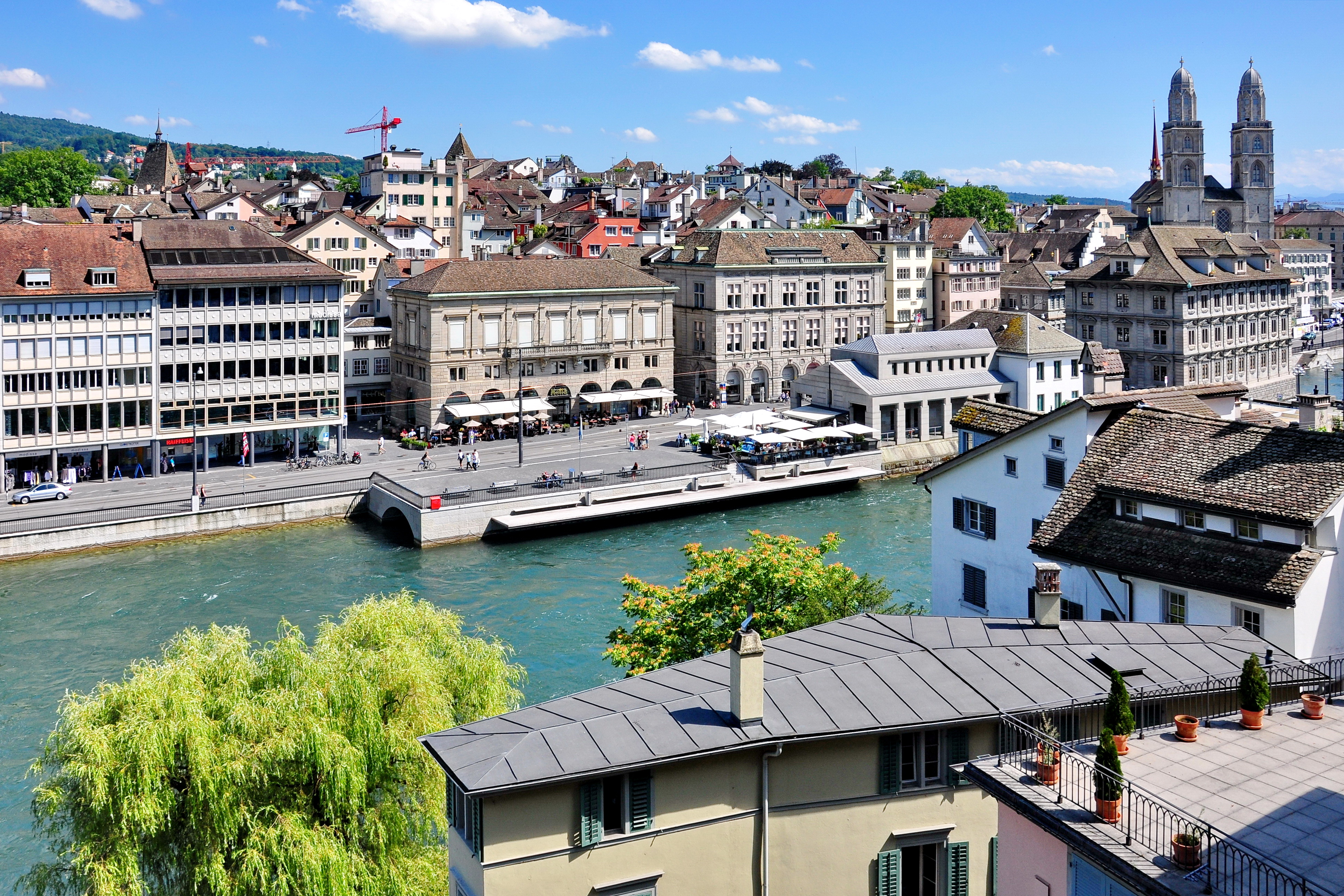
Altstadt and the Limmat as seen from Lindenhof hill

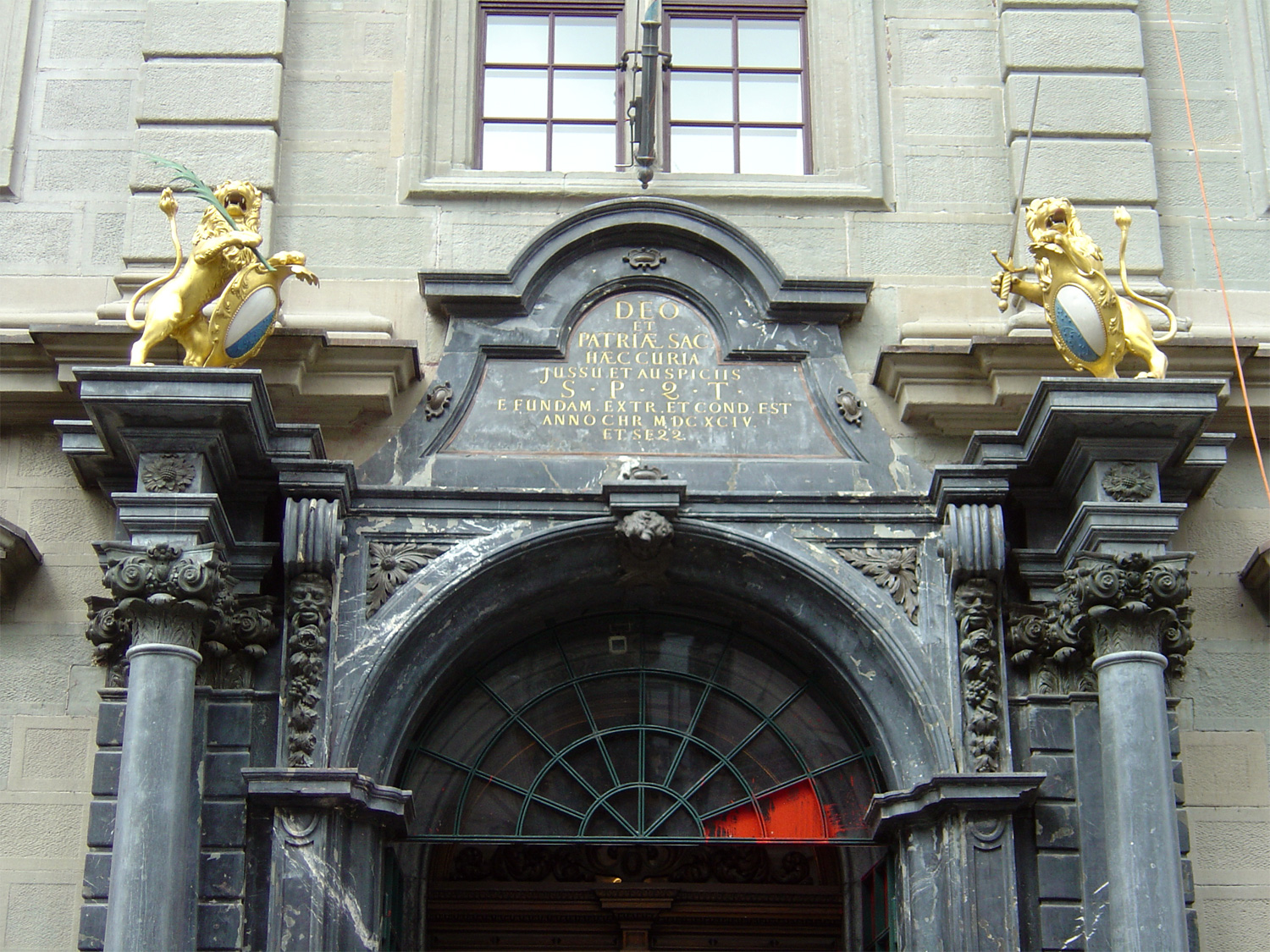
Portal

== See also ==
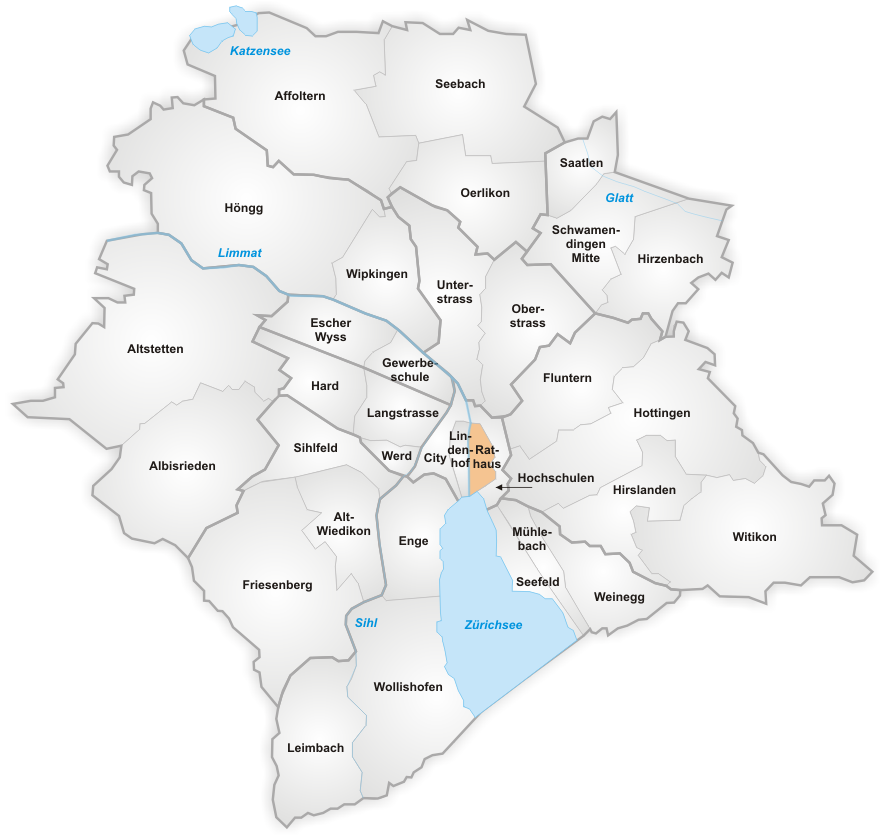
The Rathaus quarter within the Altstadt district
