= Bellevueplatz =

Town square in Zurich, Switzerland

- Das Bellevue
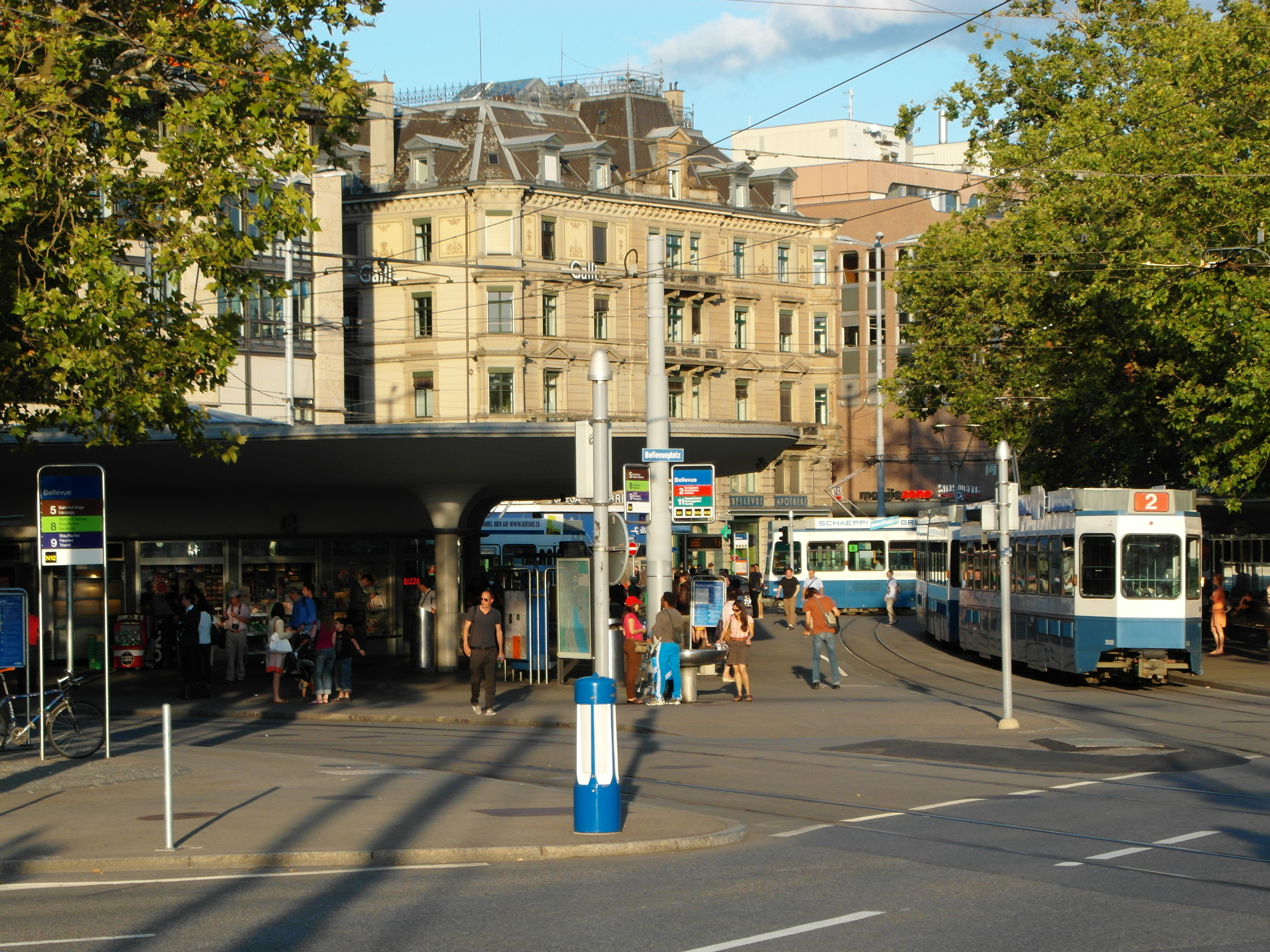
- Bellevue tram stop
- Native name: Bellevue (French)
- Namesake: former Grandhotel Bellevue
- Type: city square
- Owner: City of Zurich
- Addresses: Bellevueplatz, Zurich
- Location: Zurich, Switzerland
- Postal code: 8001
- Coordinates: 47.367°N 8.545°E

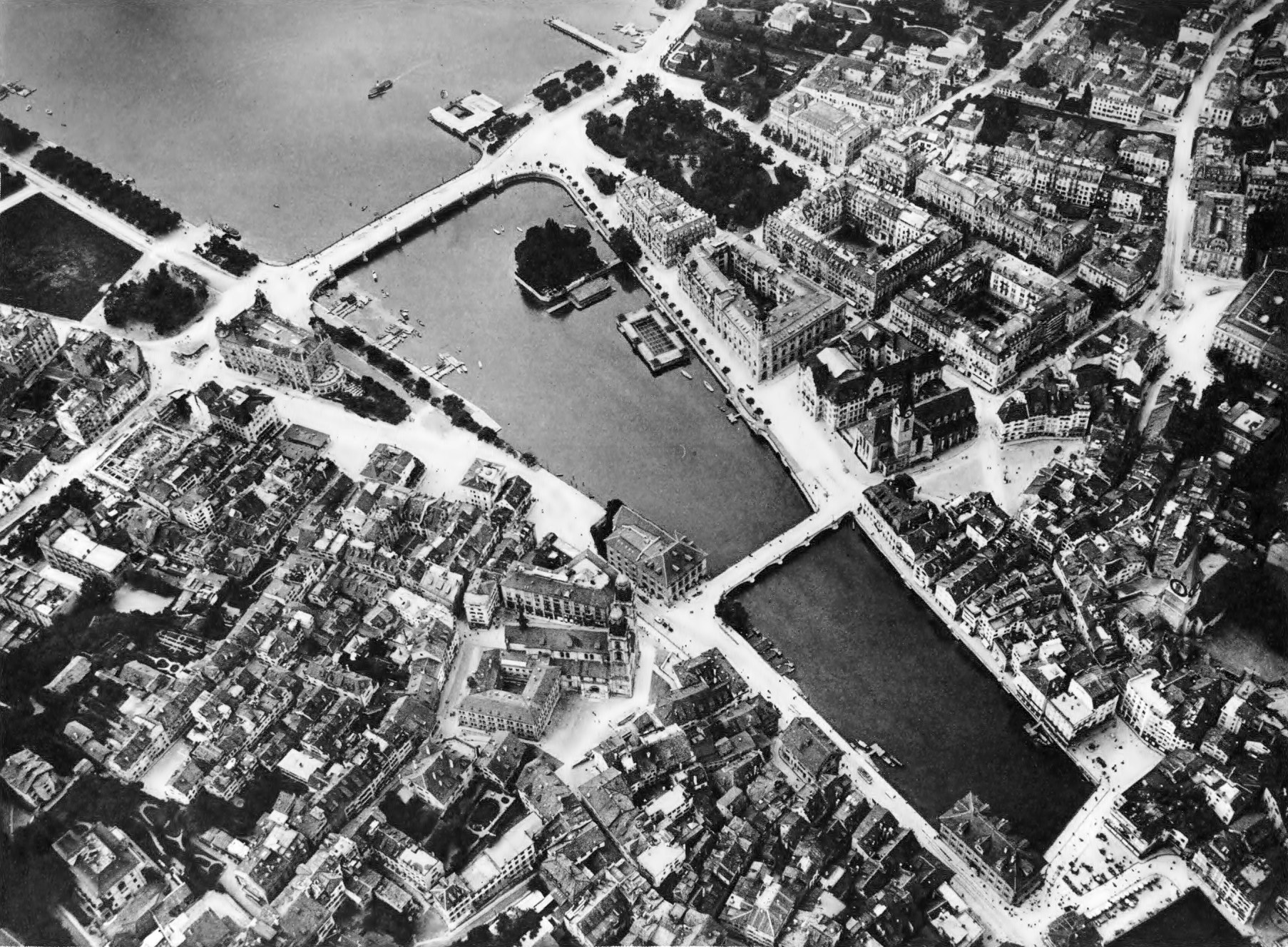
Limmatquai and other quays in Zurich: Bellevueplatz and Bürkliplatz, Quaibrücke. Also: Münsterbrücke and Münsterhof, and Rathausbrücke–Weinplatz (aerial photography by Eduard Spelterini c. mid-1890s)

Bellevueplatz (lit. 'Bellevue Square', from the French bellevue, meaning "beautiful sight") is a town square in the city of Zurich, Switzerland built in 1856. Named after the former Grandhotel Bellevue on its north side, it is one of the nodal points for roads and public transportation in Zurich, as well as an extension of the quaysides in Zurich that were built between 1881 and 1887. It is part of the Altstadt district (Kreis 1).

== Geography ==
Bellevue is situated next to the much larger Sechseläutenplatz (lit. 'Sechseläuten Square') to the south of Bellevue. To the west is the Quaibrücke (lit. 'Quay Bridge'), which runs over the outflow of Lake Zurich into the Limmat, making it the southernmost bridge over the Limmat. To the north is the Limmatquai, a street running along the riverbank. To the south is Utoquai, a lakefront quay. The square is bound by Theaterstrasse to the east, Rämistrasse to north, and Schoeckstrasse to the south. The square is about 200 metres (660 ft) north-west of the Stadelhofen railway station.

== Transportation ==
The square is one of the nodal points of Zurich tram lines 2, 4, 5, 8, 9, 11, and 15, as well the regional bus lines 912 and 916, being the border between the Rathaus and Hochschulen quarters. The square was not used in the classical sense as a public square for recreation until the adjoining Sechseläutenplatz was rebuilt in 2013 for public use.

== Points of interest ==
In addition to the Sechseläutenplatz and quaysides, there is also Café Odeon, where writers and the Zurich Bohème would meet, the Kronenhalle and Sternen Grill restaurants, and the Limmatquai and other attractions downstream along the Limmat.

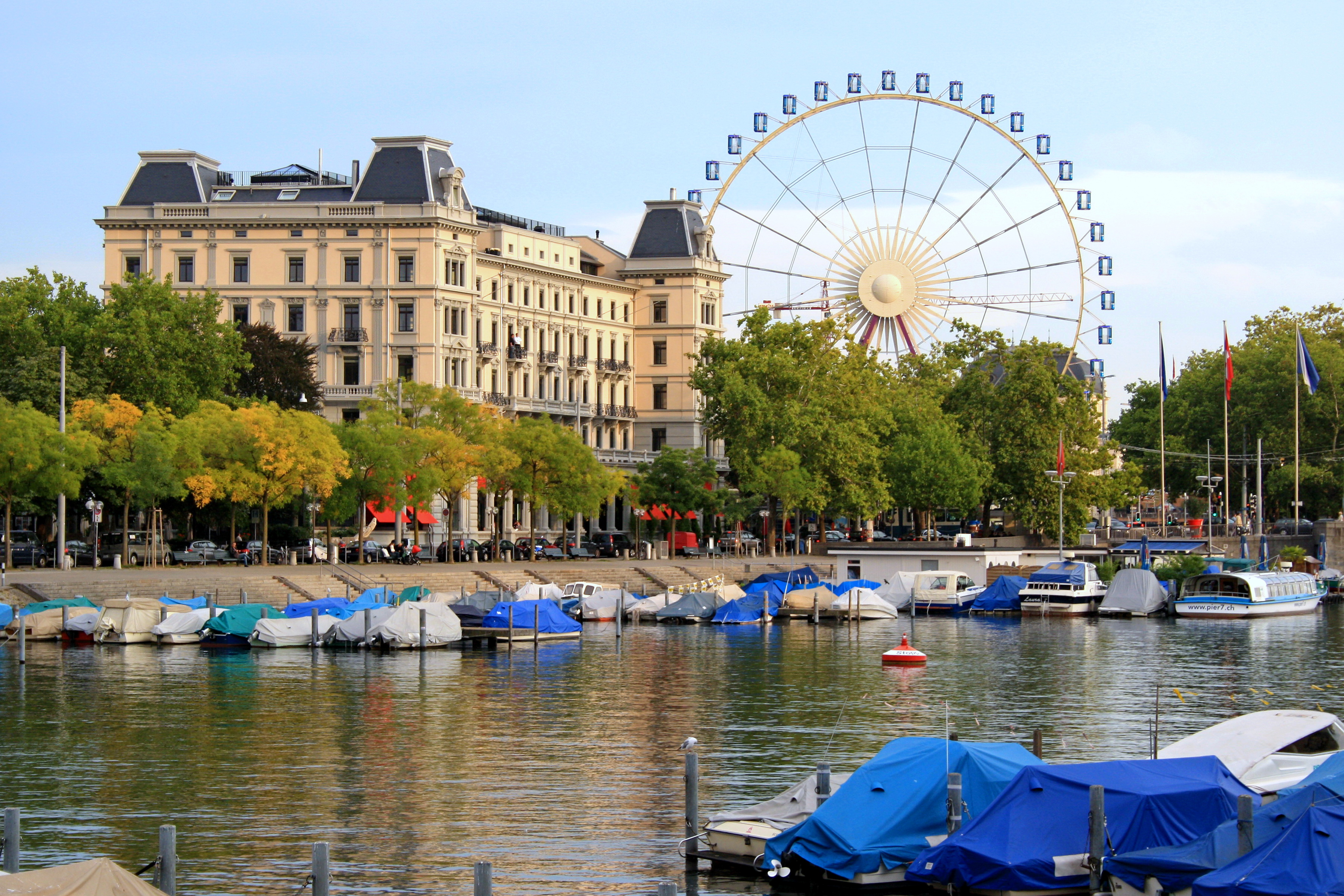
Haus Bellevue

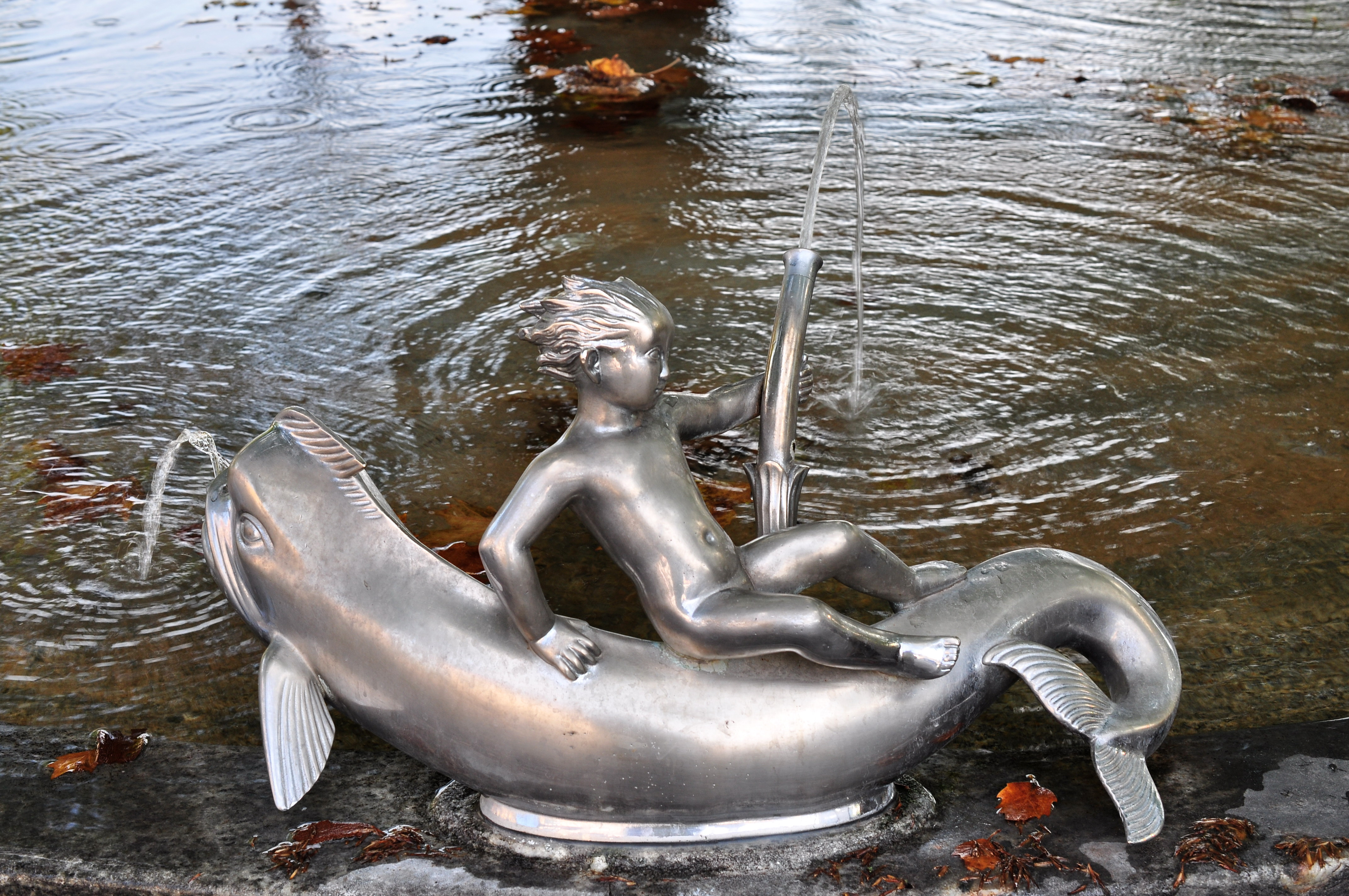
Fountain sculpture at one of the two drinking fountains at Bellevue

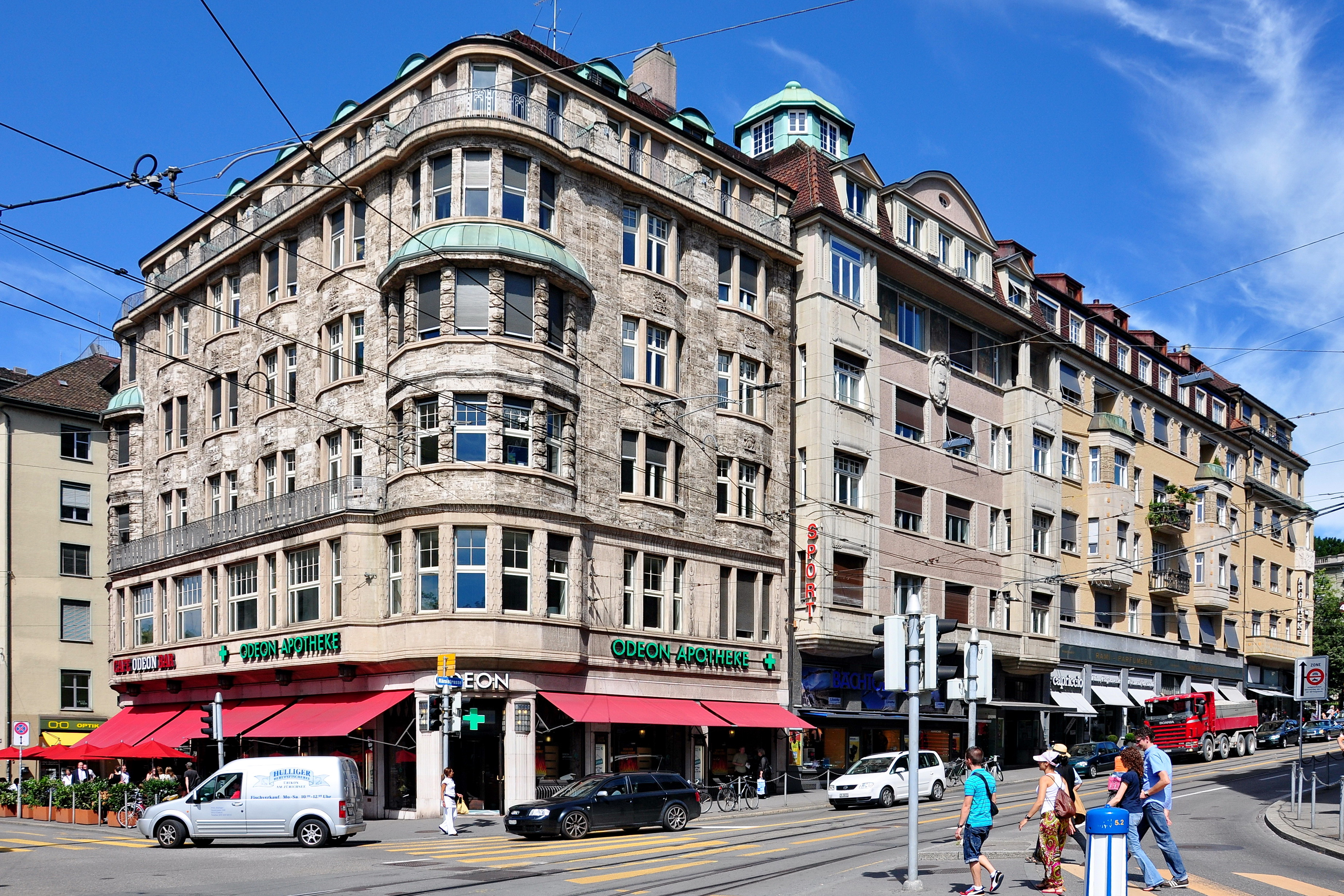
Café Odeon, formerly one of the best known meeting points of Zurich's Bohème, Limmatquai/Rämistrasse

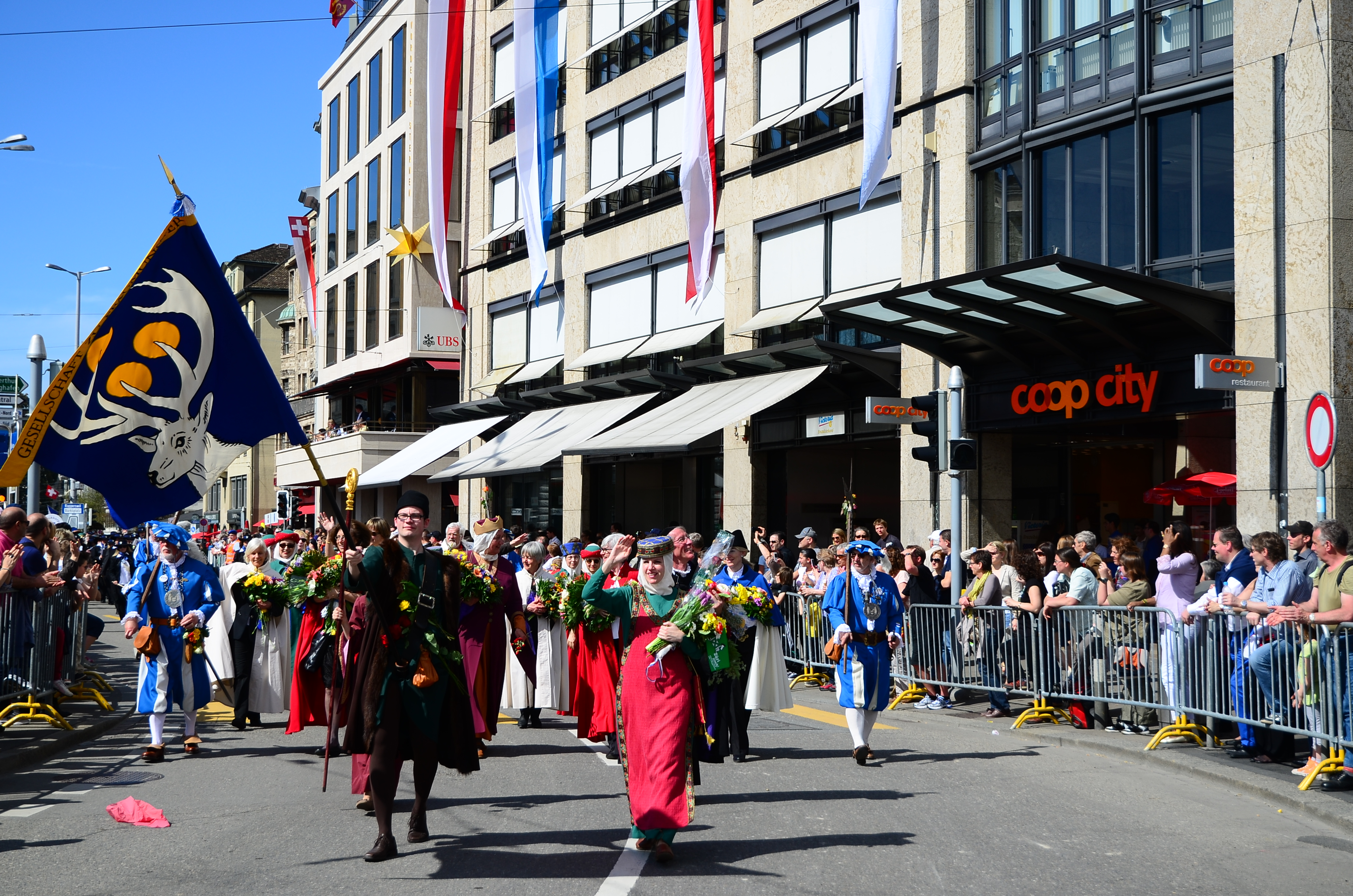
Gesellschaft zu Fraumünster on occasion of Sechseläuten 2013

In the historic tram stop building, there are two snack bars and a kiosk, a ZüriWC public toilet, and a ticket counter of the Zürcher Verkehrsverbund (ZVV) public transportation company.

== History ==
Located on what was once swampland between the Limmat and Lake Zurich, prehistoric pile dwellings around Lake Zurich were discovered dating to the Neolithic and Bronze Age. They were built on small islands and peninsulas and set on piles to protect against occasional flooding by the Linth and Jona. One such site, Zurich–Enge Alpenquai, is located on the Lake Zurich shore in Enge, a locality of the municipality of Zurich. It was neighbored by similar settlements at Kleiner Hafner and Grosser Hafner on what was then a peninsula in the effluence of the lake, within an area of about 0.2 km^{2} (0.077 sq mi) within the present city of Zurich. The settlement sites are listed on the UNESCO World Heritage Site Prehistoric pile dwellings around the Alps, and in the Swiss inventory of cultural property of national and regional significance as a Class object.

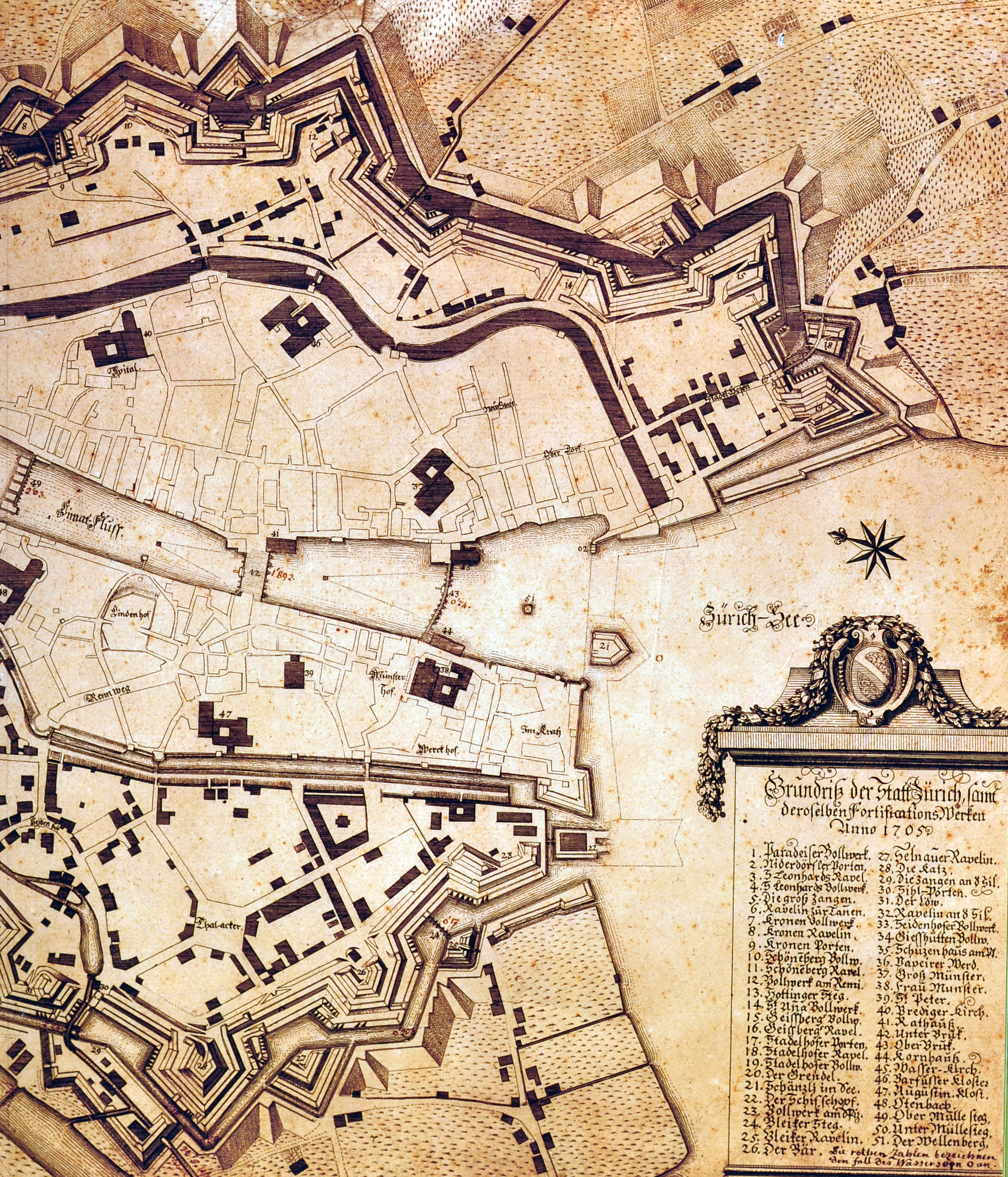
copperplate print by Johann Heinrich Vogel, showing the area in 1705

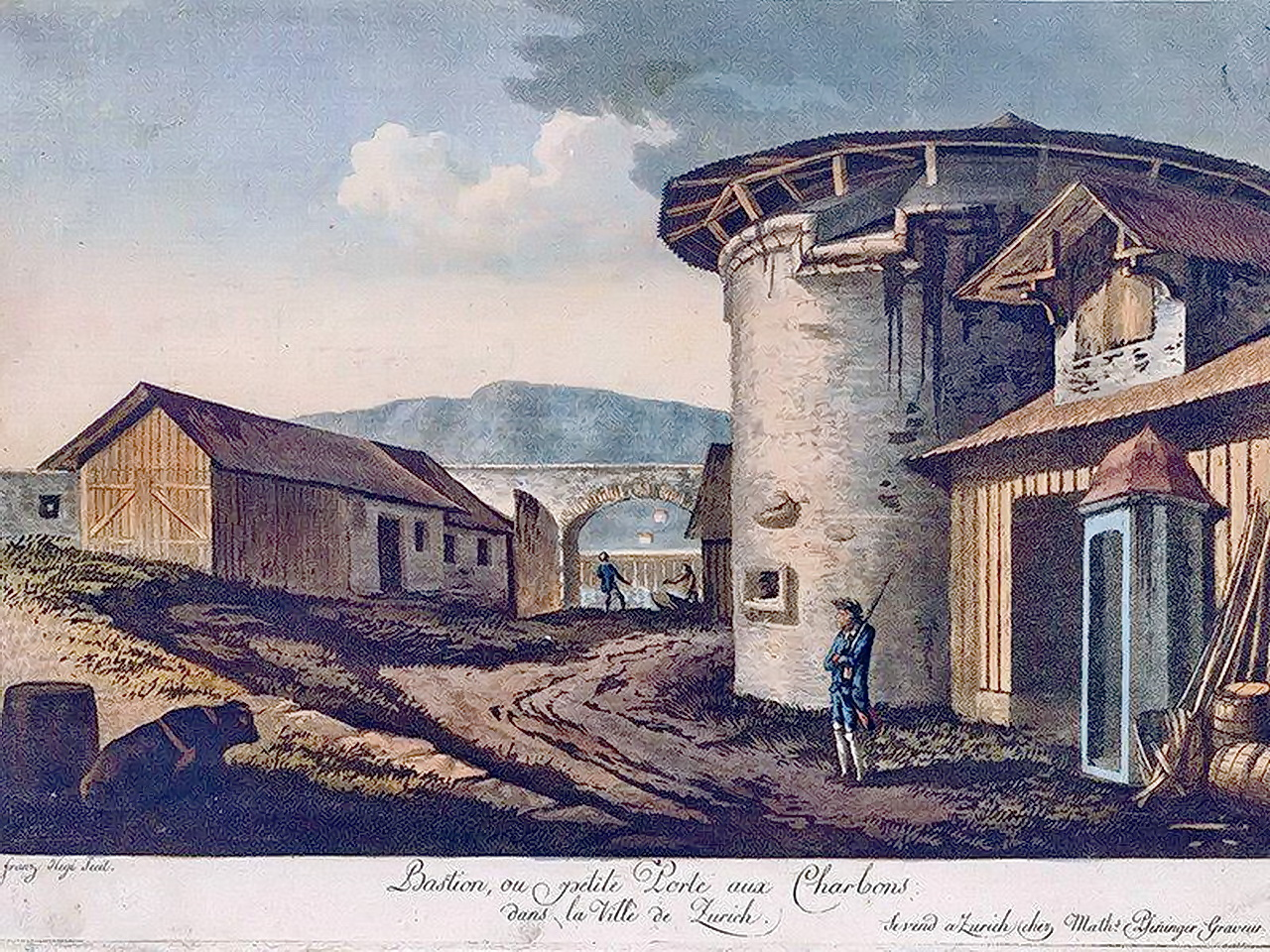
Kohlepörtli gate at the present Sechseläutenplatz, Franz Hegi and Matthias Pfenninger, c. 1795

From 1558 to 1562, the round Auf Dorf bastion with battlements was built at the site of the present Bellevueplatz at the junction of Limmatquai and Rämistrasse. Structurally, it was connected to the Langenöhrlisturm of the city fortification, and was originally surrounded almost entirely by the water of Lake Zurich. The bulwark comprised casemates with loopholes and a platform for artillery to defend against attackers on the lake. It complemented the Bauschänzli bastion on the western side of the Limmat, and the medieval Grendeltor, a river gate and customs station that stood on the site of Haus Bellevue. Around 1700, after the construction of embankments, the bulwark lost its original function. Equipped with a solid roof, the area served as a Salzhaus (salt storage). Until 1795, the construction of a new seawall was carried out, and at the Kohlepörtli gate, goods were transhipped between Lake Zurich and Limmat. Remains from the c. 1830 demolition were discovered on occasion of road works in March 2015.

First mentioned in 1863, the square was named after the hotel Bellevue, which was built at Limmatquai 1 in 1856.

In mid-October 1937, Hermann Herter's design for the Bellevue-Rondell, to replace an old station concourse, was under construction at the square. While the heavy iron canopy was being raised, a hoist broke and a worker fell to the ground with the structure. There were no injuries.

Despite the official name, Bellevueplatz, it is often referred to by locals as "das Bellevue" (lit. 'the Bellevue'), and is now one of the most important transport hubs in the city, for public transport as well as road traffic. Like the Bürkliplatz square on the opposite side of the Quaibrücke, Bellevueplatz is used for Sechseläuten and other public festivals, so traffic operations have to be stopped several times each year.

== Renewal ==
Bellevueplatz was renovated between March and 25 October 2015, with minor corrections in November 2015, during which the tram lines were redirected from June to mid-August. The edges of the tram tracks are designed to not cause obstruction, and the tracks at Rämistrasse between Café Odeon and Quaibrücke were rearranged and separated from bicycle lanes. As part of the road renewal works, the pedestrian crossings from Bellevue to Utoquai and from Sechseläutenplatz to Utoquai have been provided with a protective island that is tactilely detectable for visually impaired people.

== See also ==
- Prehistoric pile dwellings around Lake Zurich
