= Limmatquai =

Street in Zürich, Switzerland

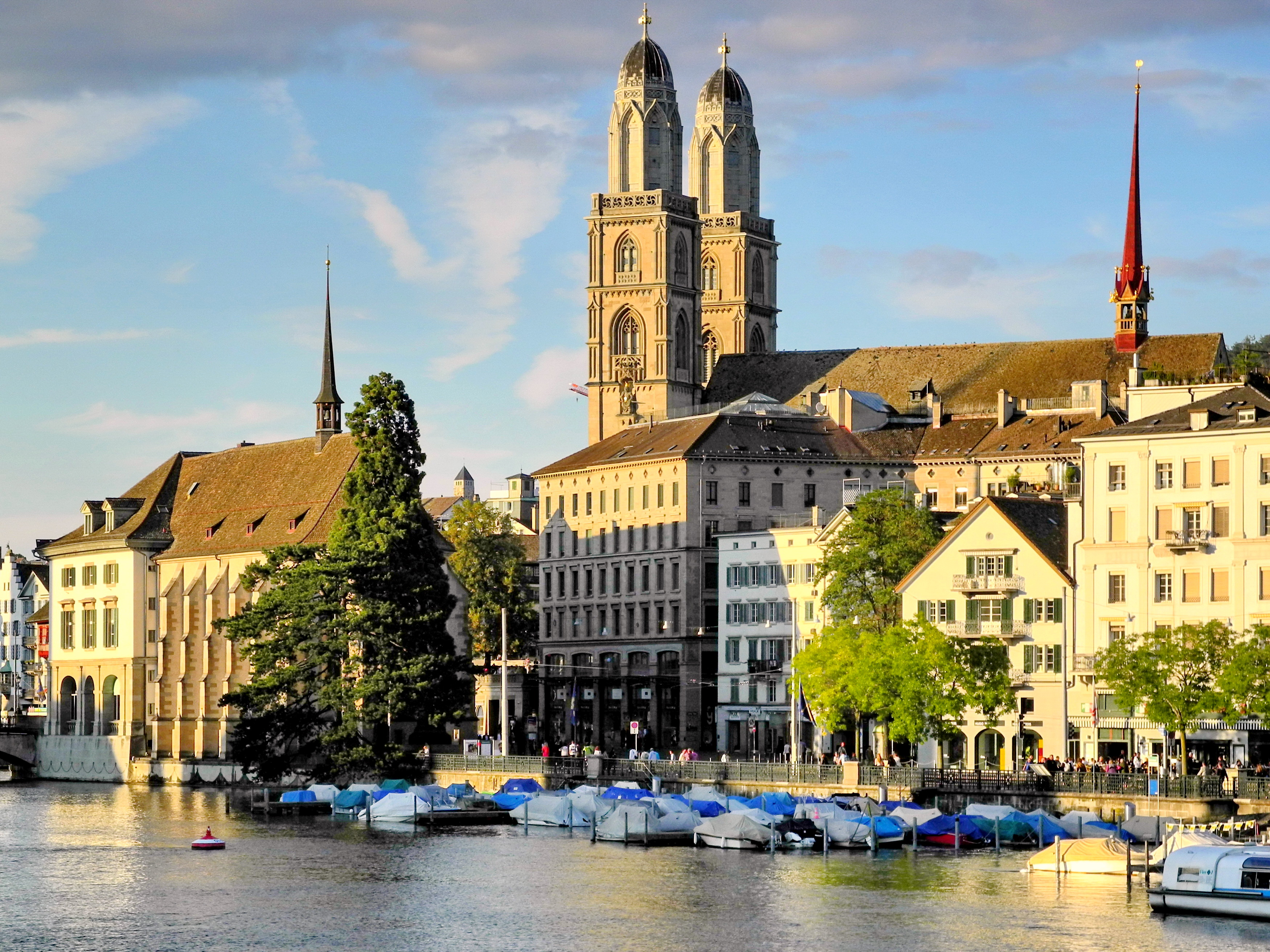
- Limmatquai
- Interactive map of Limmatquai
- Former names: Sonnenquai; Rathausquai
- Type: pedestrian zone, road, tramway
- Length: 1 kilometre (0.6 mi)
- Addresses: Limmatquai
- Location: Zurich, Switzerland
- Postal code: 8001
- Coordinates: 47.372944°N 8.542767°E

Limmatquai (lit. 'Limmat Quay') is a street in Zurich, Switzerland. It is named after the Limmat, and it follows the right-hand (eastern) bank of that river for about 1 kilometre (0.6 mi) through the Altstadthistorical core of the city. The street was once important for both road and public transportation, but today sections of it form a pedestrian zone shared with Zurich's trams, effectively forming a northern extension of the Seeuferanlage promenades that ring the shores of Lake Zurich.

The Limmatquai has its southern end adjacent to the Quaibrücke (lit. 'Quay Bridge') and Bellevue square, where the Limmat flows out of Lake Zurich. Its northern end is at the Bahnhofbrücke (lit. 'Railway Station Bridge') and Central plaza. Between the Quaibrücke and the Bahnhofbrücke, the river is crossed by four other bridges all of which connect to the Limmatquai; from south to north these are the Münsterbrücke, Rathausbrücke, Rudolf-Brun-Brücke (named after Rudolf Brun) and Mühlesteg (a pedestrian bridge).

For most of its length, the street runs directly alongside the river, with buildings only on its eastern side, and with a clear view across the river to the west. The only buildings abutting the street from the west are the Wasserkirche, located on what was originally an island within the river, together with the Rathaus (town hall) and a police station, which both form part of the Rathausbrücke bridge structure.

== History ==
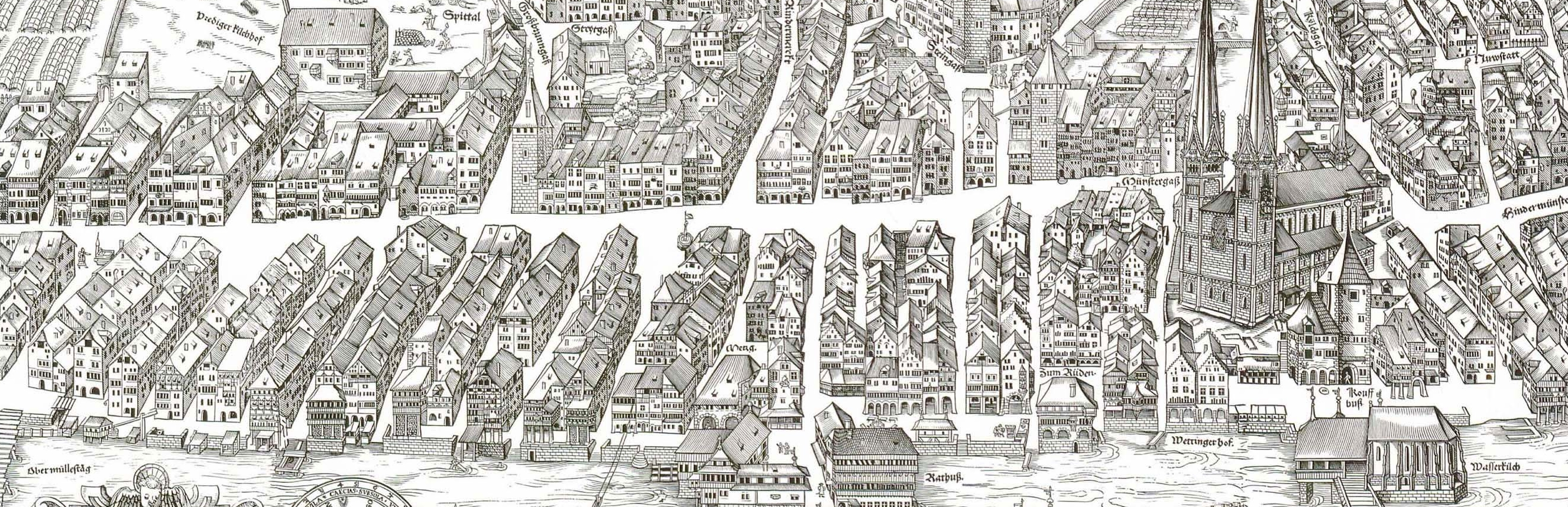
Map of the area from the Murerplan of 1576, showing absence of the Limmatquai

In the 12th and 13th centuries, the houses alongside the east bank of the Limmat were built directly on the shore, and were accessed from Oberdorfstrasse and Niederdorfstrasse, two streets on their landward sides. Over the course of the following centuries, the Limmat was increasingly channeled, and it can be demonstrated that the right bank of the Limmat is now up to 28 metres (92 ft) in front of the original bank. Although the Limmatquai as a through road along the river side dates from the 19th century, it was actually built in several sections at different times and under different names, and the name Limmatquai has only applied to the full length of the current street since 1933.

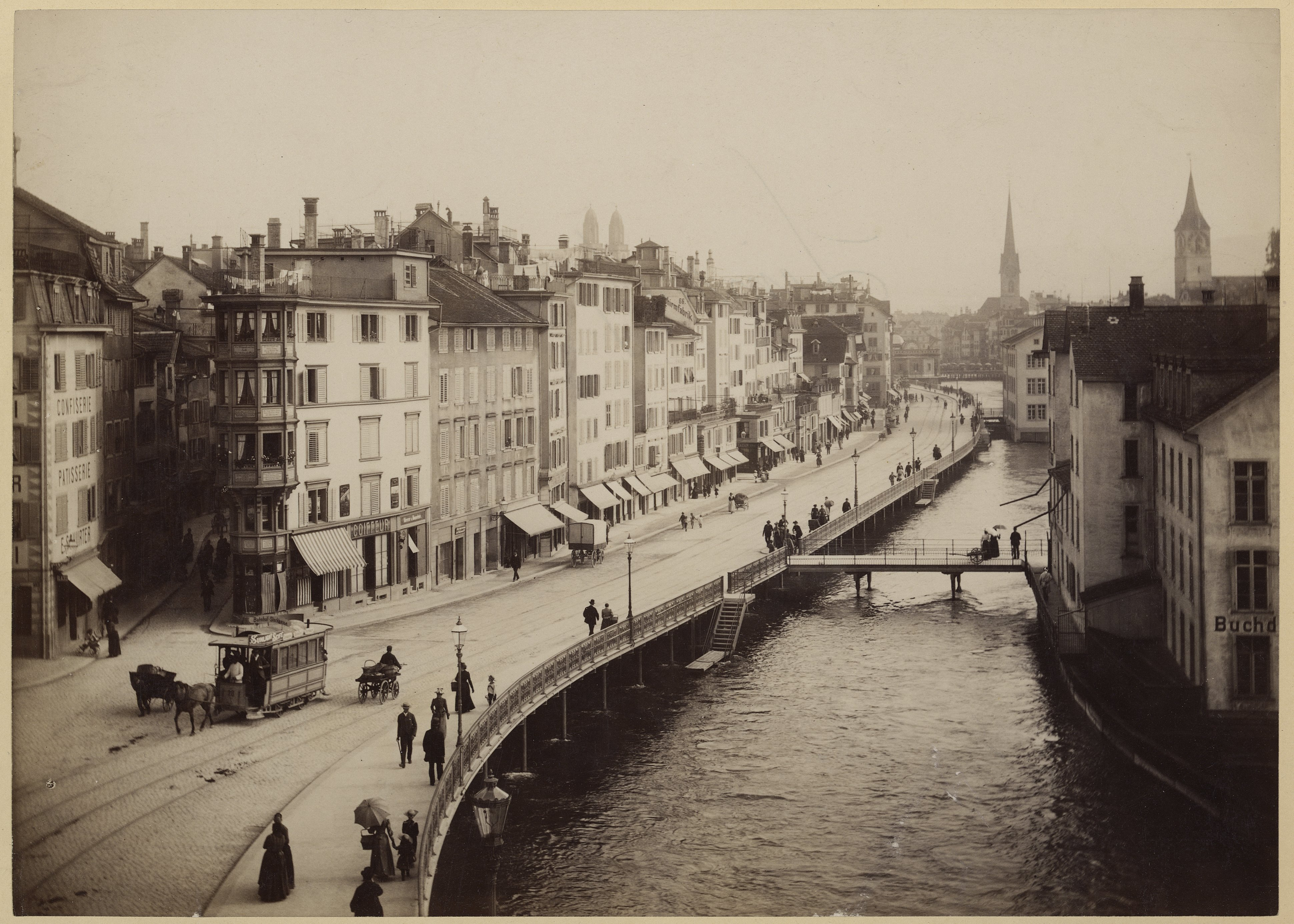
Limmatquai as seen from Central around the 1880s

The section downstream of the Marktgasse (lit. ' Market Lane') and the Rathaus was originally known as Marktststrasse or Altes Limmatquai, and was built in two stages, south of Rosengasse between 1823 and 1825, and to the north between 1855 and 1859. The section between the Rathaus and the steps up to Grossmünsterplatz (next to Grossmünster) was originally known as Rathausquai and was built in 1835/36, along with the Münsterbrücke. The section upstream of the steps was originally known as Sonnenquai (lit. 'Sun Quay') and was built between 1835 and 1839. In the years 1887 to 1891, the whole street was broadened, and the Limmatquai assumed its present appearance.

== Points of interest ==
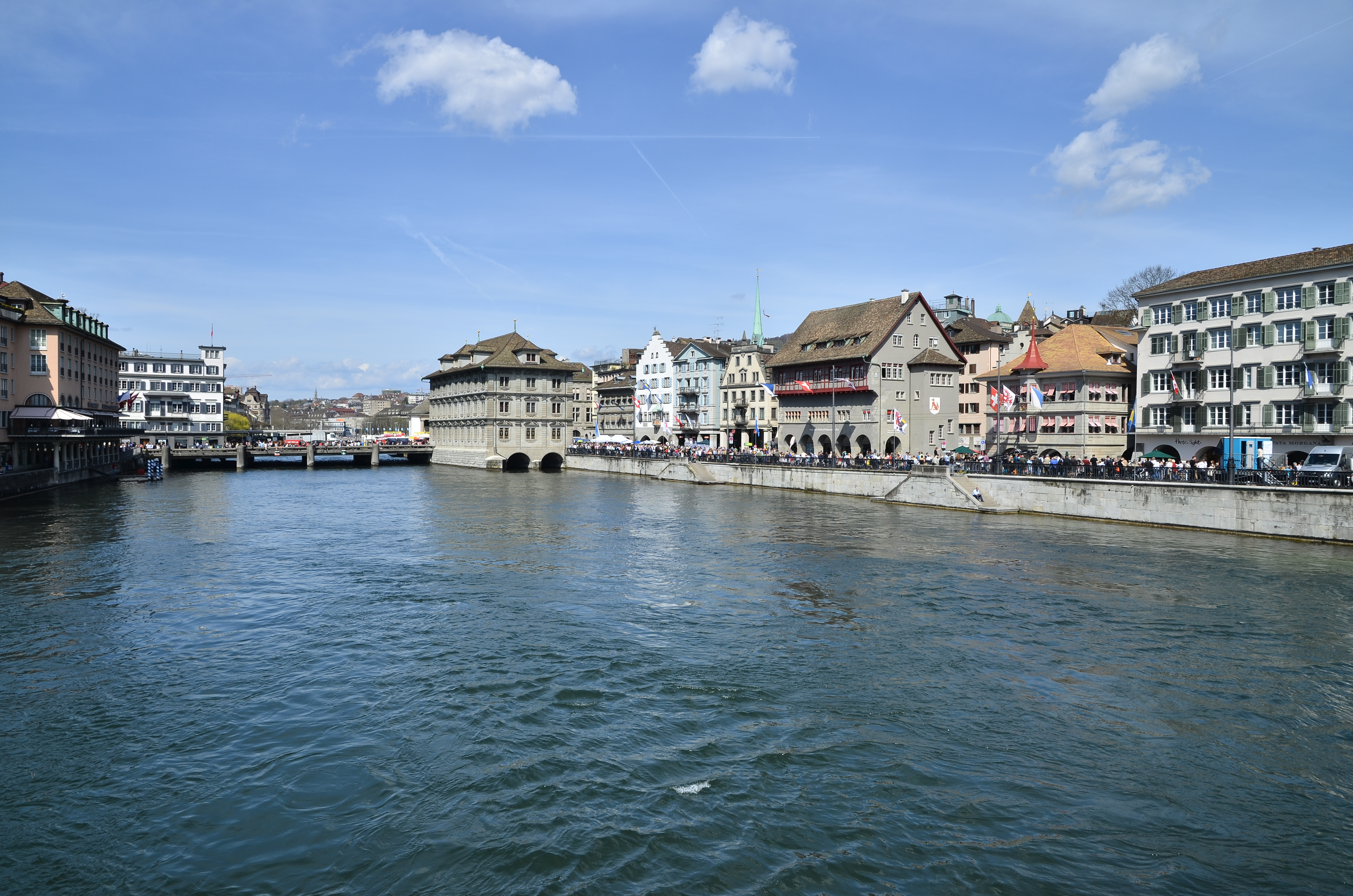
Rathaus, and the guild houses zur Saffran, zur Haue, zum Rüden and zur Zimmerleuten, as seen from Münsterbrücke.

The churches of Grossmünster and Wasserkirche are both adjacent to the Limmatquai, although both predate its construction. The Grossmünster lies to the east, at the top of a flight of stairs, whilst the Wasserkirche lies on a former river island joined to the street. Among the numerous secular buildings of interest on the street are the Haus zum Rüden, the guild houses of Zimmerleuten, Haue and Saffran, and the Rathaus that was the seat of the assemblies of the city and of the cantonal parliaments.

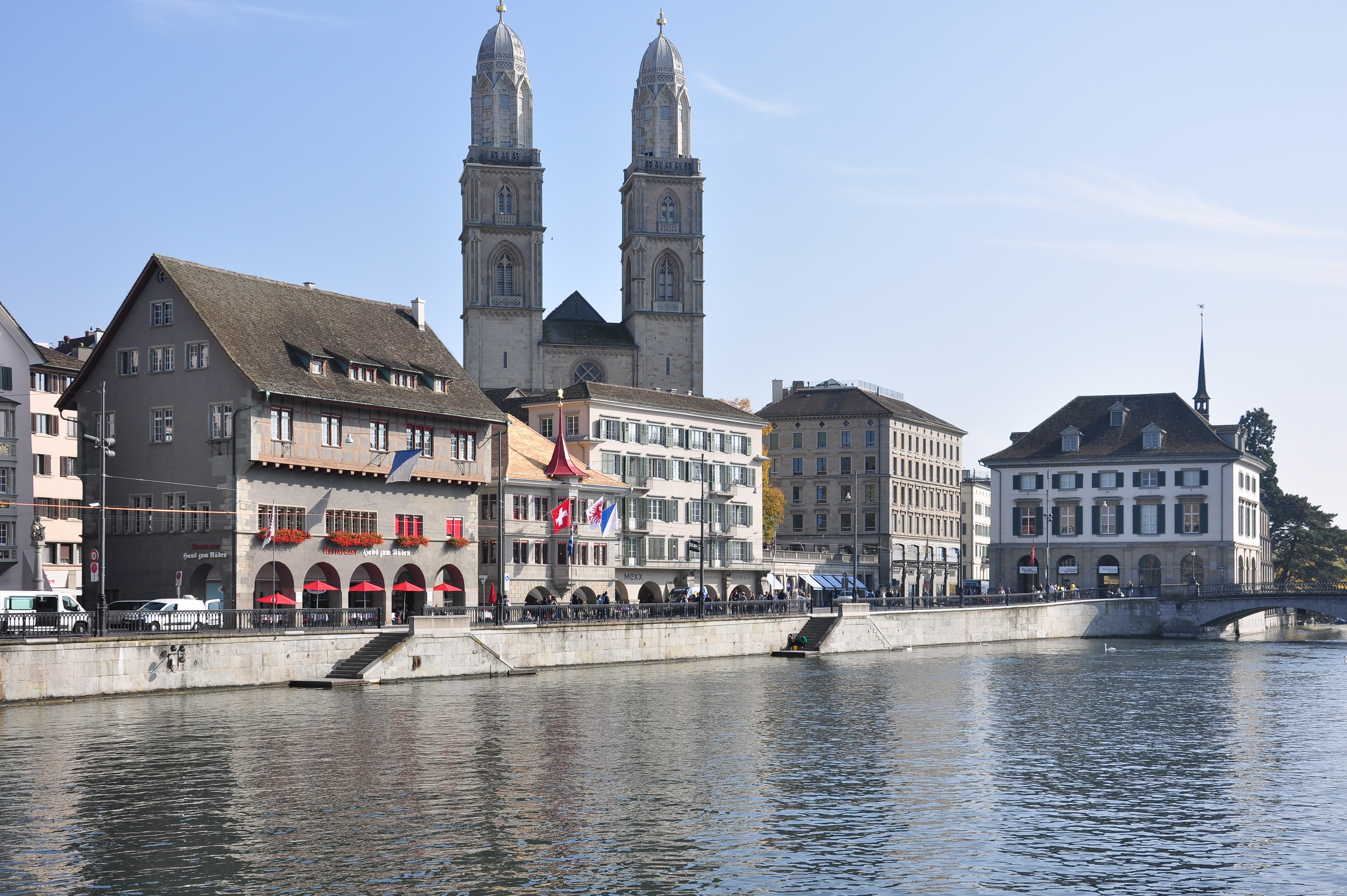
The area of the former Rathausquai

Views across the river from the Limmatquai include the Fraumünster church, the Hotel zum Storchen, the Schipfe and the Lindenhof. The Limmatquai is also one of the main attractions for tourists, and has many small shops, cafés and restaurants.

== Transport ==
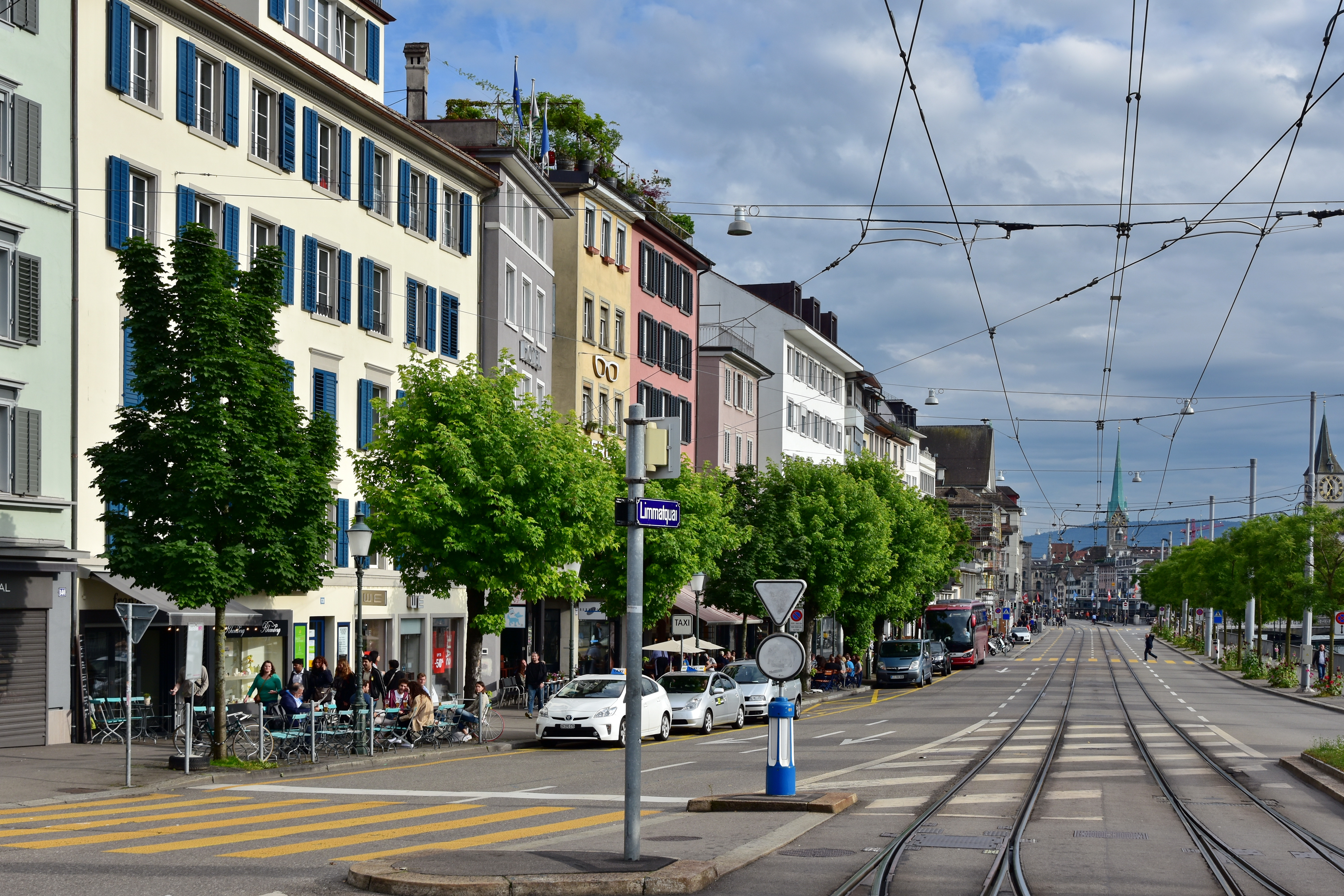
The street and tram tracks

Zürich tram lines 4 and 15 traverse the Limmatquai between Bellevue and Central stops, calling at the intermediate stops at Helmhaus, Rathaus and Rudolf-Brun-Brücke. The Limmat tour boats operated by the Lake Zurich navigation company call at a landing stage mid-way along the Limmatquai on their route between Zürichhorn and the Landesmuseum.

Most private vehicles are prohibited; the area is the largest pedestrian zone of Zurich. Since 25 September 2004, the driving of motor vehicles, motorcycles and scooters is forbidden, except for goods transport, traffic towards Weinplatz, postal delivery services, and doctors and emergency services. Private road transport between Central and Brun bridge and Uraniastrasse (Urania Sternwarte) at the site of the former Oetenbach nunnery is still allowed, as well as between the former upper Limmatquai and Bellevueplatz at the upper end of the Limmat, as the road traffic via Utoquai and Rämistrasse still uses the Bellevue house area as a turning point towards General-Guisan-Quai.

== Future developments ==
According to the project Riviera, the waterfront promenade between Utoquai, Quaibrücke and Limmatquai will be planted with two-row lines of Chestnut trees, and along the staircase to the Limmat will be added a third detached tree row of Styphnolobium japonicum. The garden restaurant Terrasse will be redesigned, while the snack stand is maintained. Bus and motorized road transport operate in the future on a common track, meaning the separate bus lane at Utoquai is repealed, but on the river shore a bidirectional cycle path added.

== Culture ==
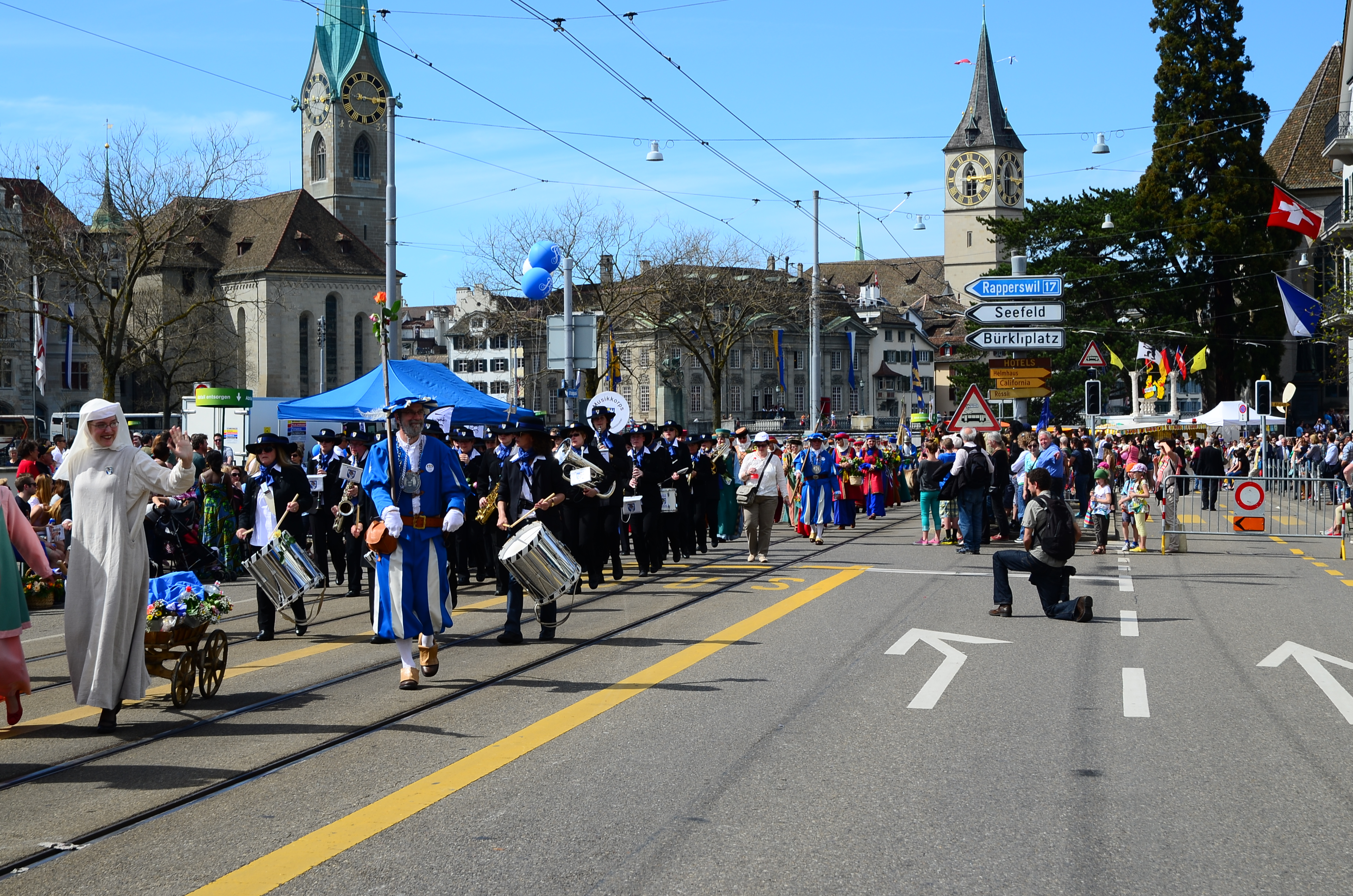
The Sechseläuten parade on Limmatquai

The best-known event on the Limmatquai is the annual Sechseläuten parade which traverses the street on its way to Sechseläutenplatz.

The fictitious 2007 Swiss mystery film Marmorea was filmed at the Burghölzli sanatory in the Weinegg district, on the Limmat near Technopark Zürich, at the Limmatquai promenade, and on the Münsterbrücke river crossing towards Münsterhof.

Between April 2014 and January 2015, an art installation known as the Hafenkran or Zürich maritim project was present on the Limmatquai. The installation comprised an old harbour crane from Dresden, together with a number of bollards and a port horn located on different high-rise buildings in Zurich. The installation proved controversial, and polarized the public and the political establishment of Zürich.

== Bibliography ==
- Das Limmatquai vor und nach der Neugestaltung. Aufenthaltsnutzung, Fuss- und Veloverkehrsaufkommen im Vergleich der Jahre 2004-2005-2008. Published by Tiefbau- und Entsorgungsdepartement der Stadt Zürich, Zurich 2009.
