= Zunft zum Kämbel =

Guild in Zurich, Switzerland

Zunft zum Kämbel ("Kämbel guild") is a guild organisation in Zürich, Switzerland. The guild was established in 1336; the guild house, Haus zur Haue, is situated at Limmatquai.

Coats of arms of Zunft zum Kämbel

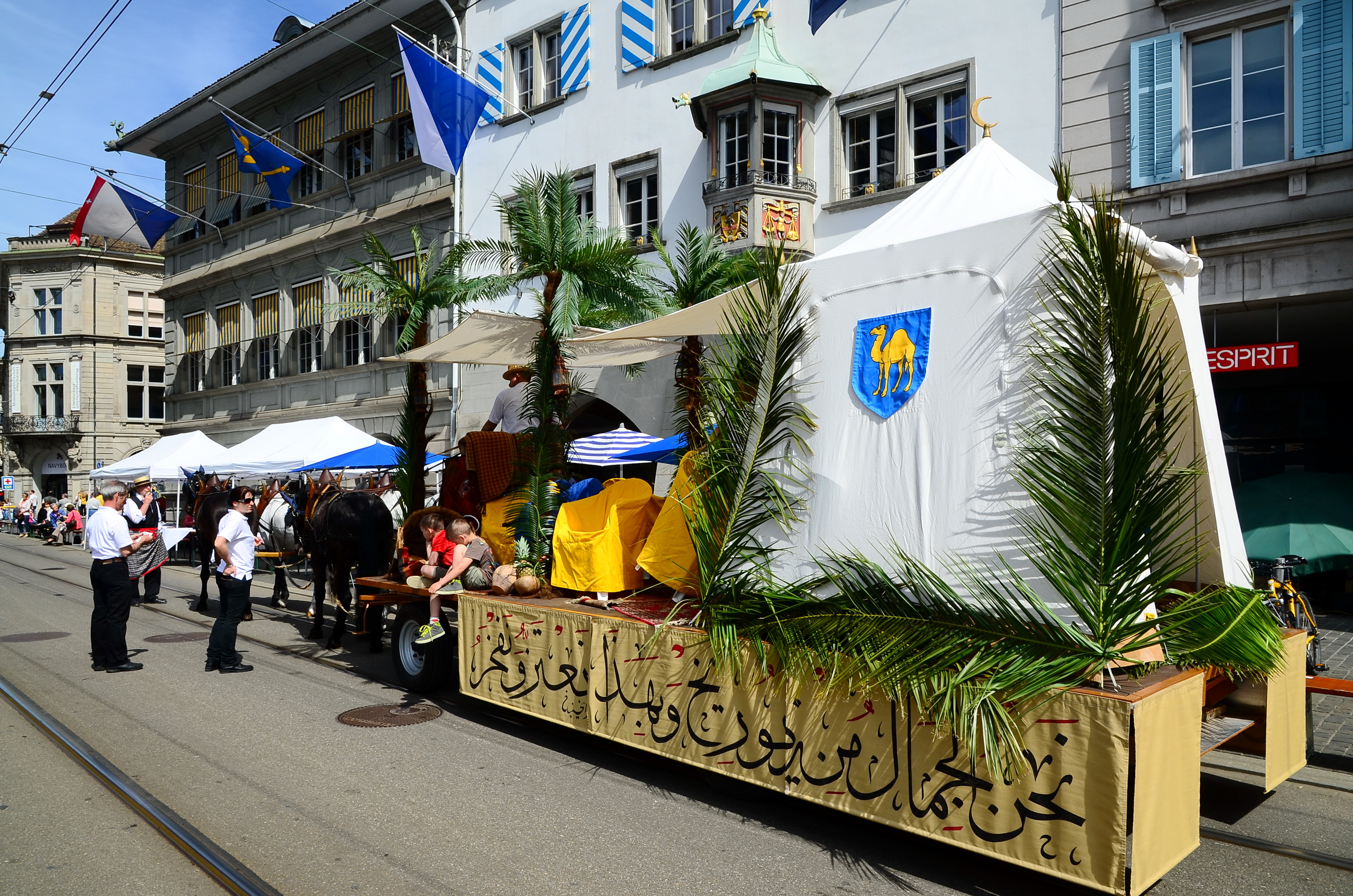
Kämbel carriage on occasion of Sechseläuten 2013 at their guild house at Limmatquai

== Guild house ==
The present Kämbel guild house, Haus zur Haue, is situated at the Rathaus bridge on Limmatquai near the Constaffel, Saffran and Zimmerleuten guild houses. Zunft zum Kämbel was originally a guild of food and wine merchants. Its first tavern and meeting place (Trinkstube) was located near the medieval town hall at Münsterhof. The guild house was first mentioned in a 1389 document as Kembel. In 1487 the guild acquired the house zum Kämbel which still exists at Münsterhof 18. The location at Münsterhof square is seen as a deliberate distancing from the noble houses of the more prominent Zürich guilds.

== History ==
The origins of the Kämbel guild date back to 1336 when, along with the other medieval Zürich guilds and the knight's association (Constaffel), it was founded on occasion of the Brun guild constitution. The guilds brought together various craft associations and at the same time were economical, political, social and even military organizations which fielded independent military formations in the medieval city-state's wars. The guild masters also constituted the councillors of the medieval city-republic of Zürich until the French revolutionary troops terminated the guild regime and the Old Swiss Confederacy collapsed in spring of 1798. In 1801 the Kämbel members sold their guildhall, but by the Act of Mediation in 1803 and 1815, the guild was temporarily re-established as one of the thirteen municipal election guilds. In the 1838 election, guilds were abolished at the cantonal level, and they were definitively abolished in Zurich by the municipal elections of 1866.

The members of Kämbel originally comprised the small merchants of the medieval city of Zürich, among them the gardeners (vegetable traders), winzers and food merchants, collectively called Grempler, from which the name of the guild is derived. In later years, the wine haulers (Wynzügel) and salt traders (Houw) also became members of the guild. As representatives of the city council, the guild's deans had to regulate the sale of goods produced by Kämbel members, and they oversaw the food stands under the arcades on Limmatquai, at Weinplatz, and at Gmüesbrugg, the "Vegetable Bridge".

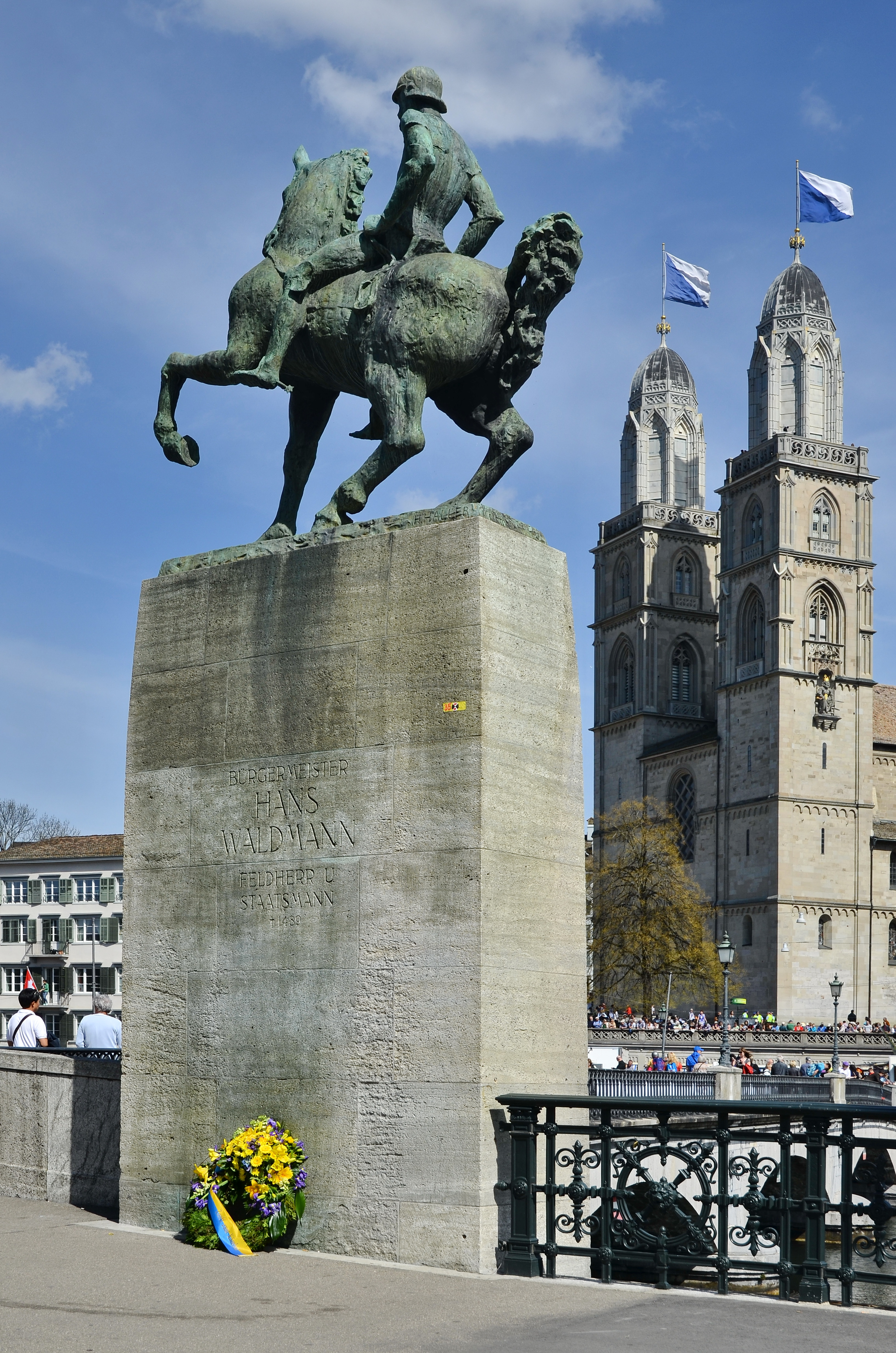
Hans Waldmann monument on occasion of the Sechseläuten ceremony 2015

The most important dean of Kämbel was Hans Waldmann (1435–1489), mayor of Zürich from 1482 to 1489, who was executed after upheavals known as the Waldmannhandel. The equestrian monument in front of the Fraumünster church at Münsterhof was created by Hermann Haller and unveiled on 6 April 1937 by the Kämbel guild in an effort to rehabilitate Hans Waldmann who, they proposed, had been the victim of a judicial murder. The equestrian statue became the subject of controversy for artistic, political and historical reasons.

== Sechseläuten ==
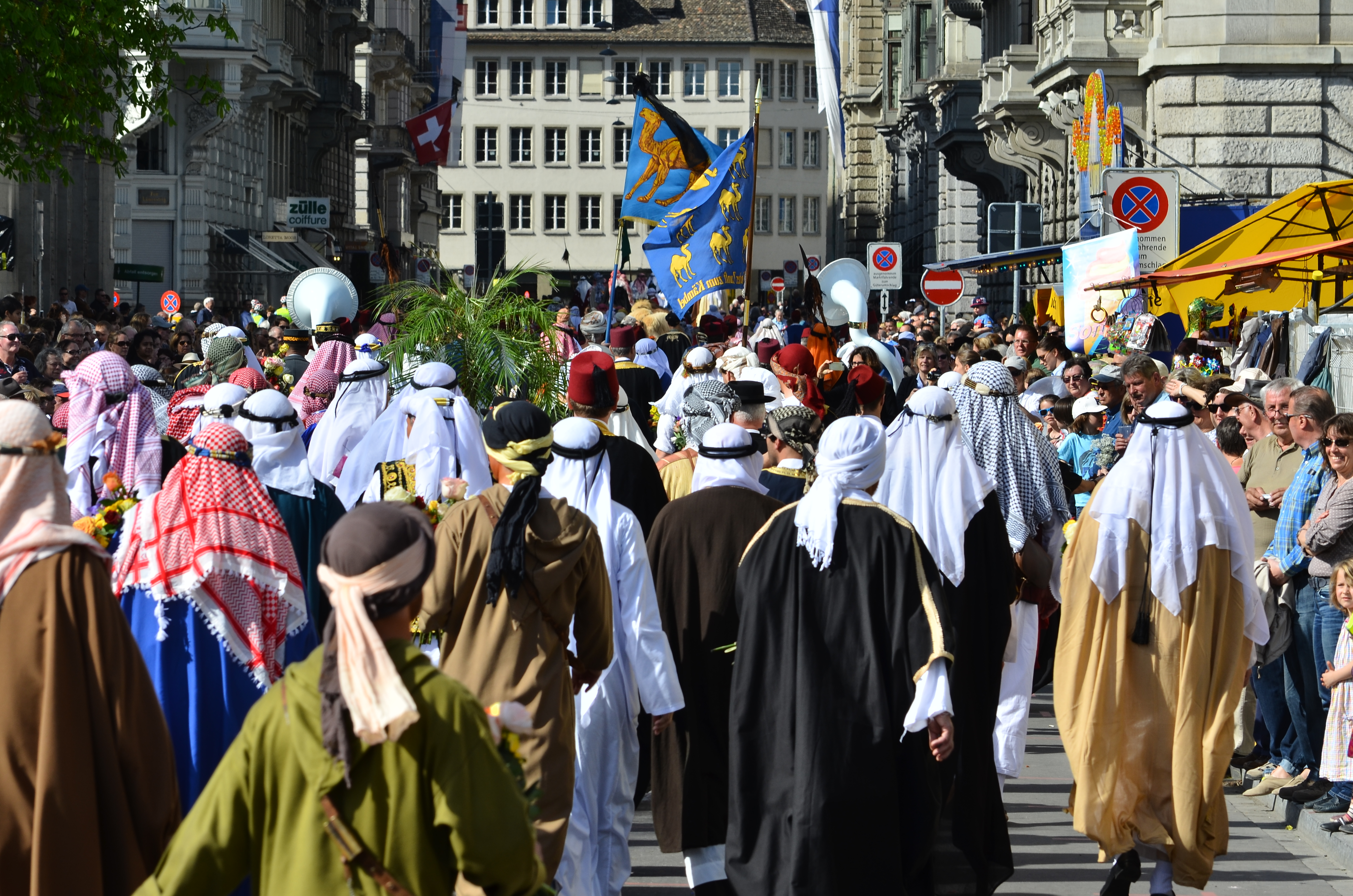
Members of the guild in "Arabian" costumes at the Bürkliplatz plaza in 2015

Like the other Zürich guilds (except the women members of the Fraumünster society, who participate only as "guests"), the members of the Kämbel guild participate in Sechseläuten. The Kämbel riders wildly circle the Böögg at Sechseläutenplatz in fanciful "Arabian" costumes as a reference to their coat of arms which shows a camel, a pun on Kämbel.

== Activities ==
The association holds monthly meetings and publishes a New Year's sheet. Its members are involved in numerous cultural projects.

== Literature ==
- Markus Brühlmeier, Beat Frei: "Das Zürcher Zunftwesen." Neue Zürcher Zeitung, Zürich 2005, ISBN 3-038231-71-1.
- Vom Dübelstein zur Waldmannsburg: Adelssitz, Gedächtnisort und Forschungsobjekt. In: Schweizer Beiträge zur Kulturgeschichte und Archäologie des Mittelalters Volume 33. Published by Schweizerischer Burgenverein, Basel 2006, ISBN 3-908182-17-4.
