= Hermann Haller (sculptor) =

Swiss sculptor (1880–1950)

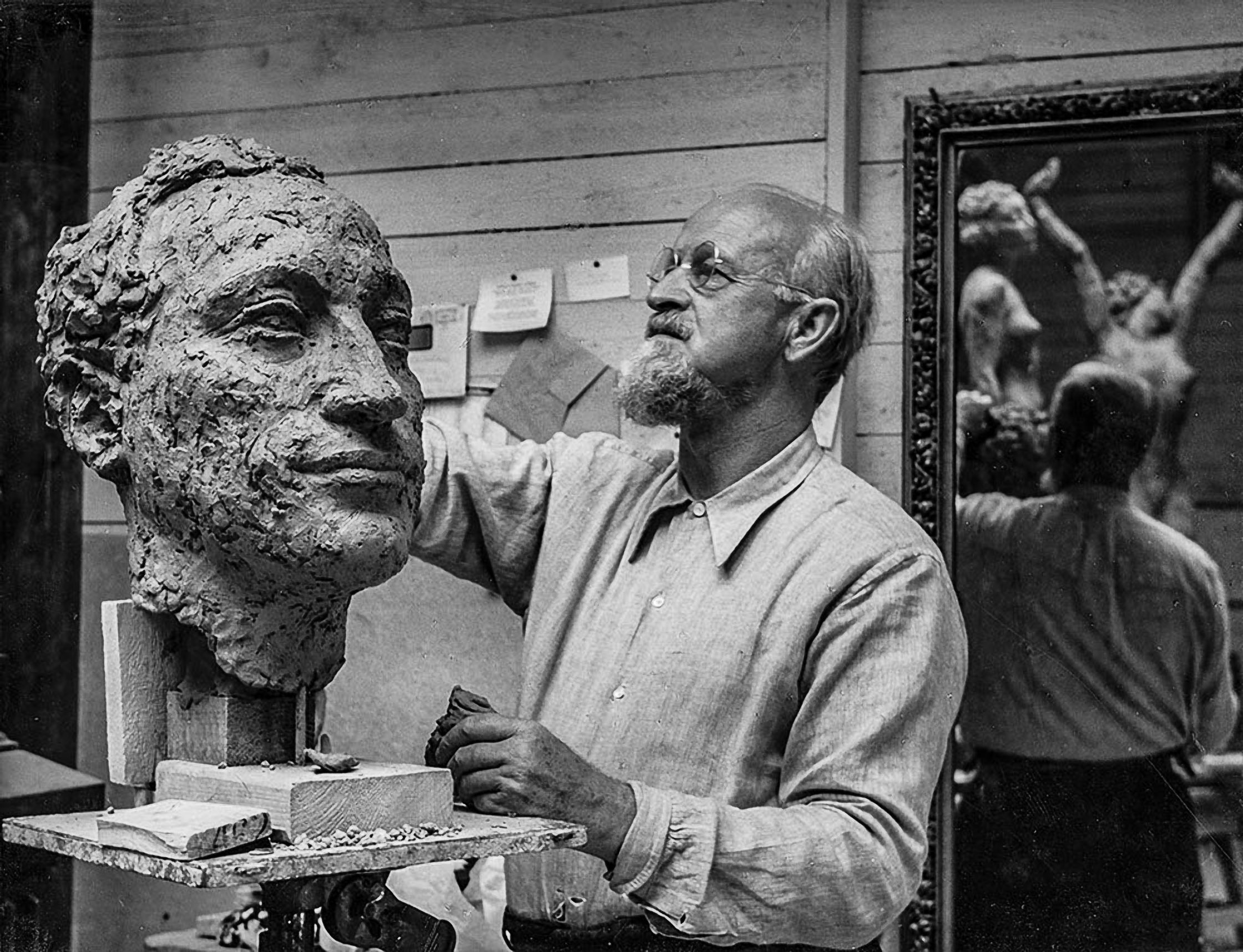
- Haller c. 1940, photographed by Hilmar Lokay
- Born: 24 December 1880; Bern, Switzerland
- Died: 23 November 1950 (aged 69); Zürich, Switzerland
- Known for: Sculpture

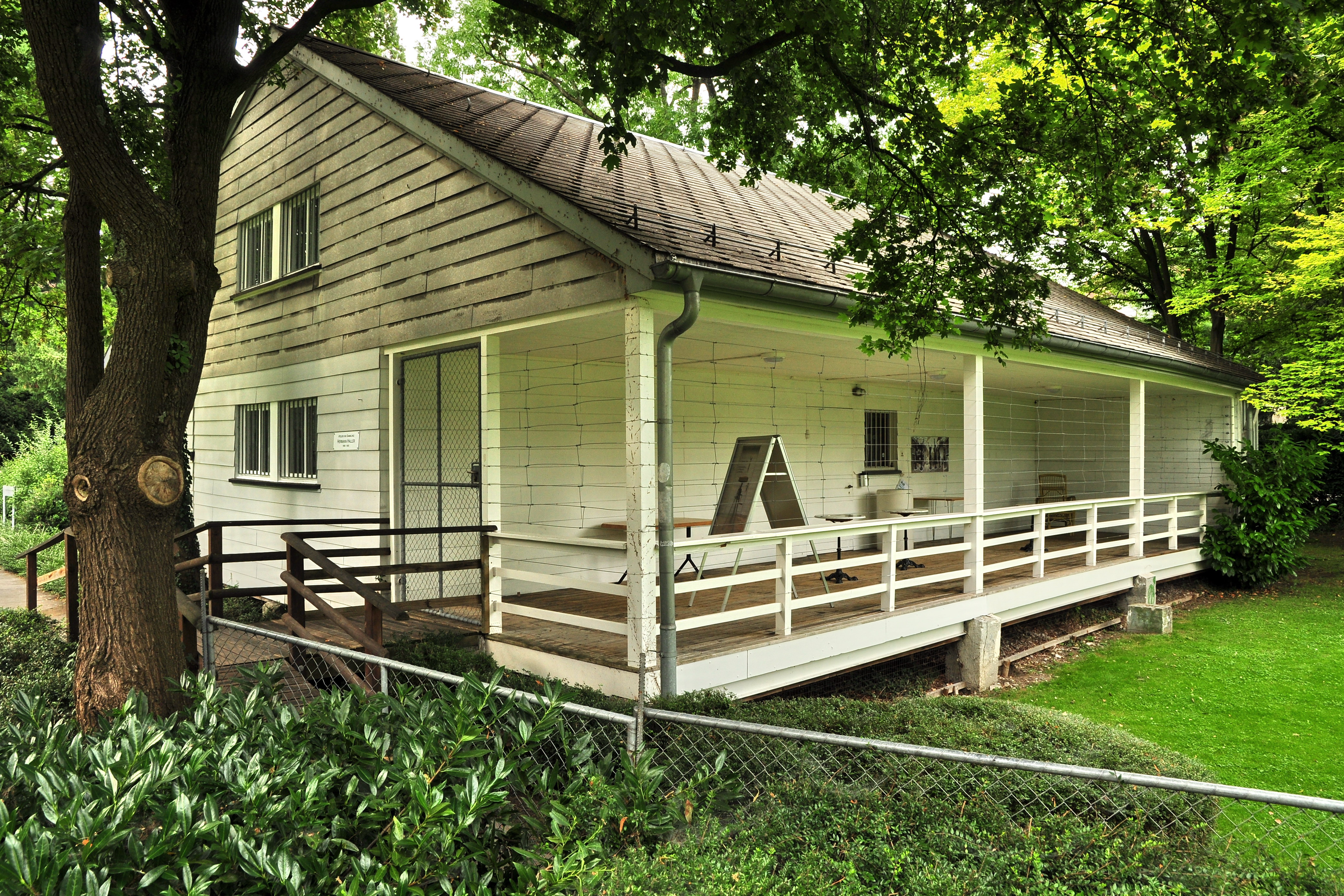
Haller's former studio in Zürich

Hermann Haller (24 December 1880 – 23 November 1950) was a Swiss sculptor. He was known for sculptures of the human figure, especially female nudes and portraits. After the First World War, he became one of Switzerland's most prominent sculptors and was also recognised in the wider German-speaking art world. In 1934, he represented Switzerland at the Venice Biennale together with Cuno Amiet. His former studio in Zürich is preserved as Atelier Hermann Haller.

== Biography ==
Hermann Haller was born in Bern on 24 December 1880. An exhibition of paintings by Ferdinand Hodler in Vevey in 1894 helped lead him toward art. After finishing secondary school, he began studying architecture in Stuttgart in 1898. During this period, he also practised painting and life drawing.

In 1899, he joined Heinrich Knirr's painting school in Munich, where he met Paul Klee, a former classmate from Bern. In 1900, Haller and Klee entered the Academy of Fine Arts, Munich, and they spent 1901 to 1902 in Italy.

Haller continued his training in Stuttgart under Leopold von Kalckreuth. With support from the Winterthur patron Theodor Reinhart, he lived in Rome from 1903 to 1909. In 1905, he turned to sculpture, influenced by Etruscan and Egyptian art. A 1907 article in Kunst und Künstler brought wider attention to his sculptures.

From 1909 to 1914, Haller lived in Paris, where he studied the work of Auguste Rodin, Aristide Maillol and Antoine Bourdelle. He declined a professorship at the art school in Weimar in 1910. He moved to Zürich in 1914.

Between 1921 and 1923, Haller spent winters in Berlin, where he was initially a guest of the art dealer Paul Cassirer. In 1932, he moved into a studio on Höschgasse in Zürich. He received an honorary doctorate from the University of Zürich in 1933 and the City of Zürich Art Prize in 1949. Haller died in Zürich on 23 November 1950.

== Work ==
Haller's sculpture focused mainly on the human figure, with the female nude as a recurring subject. His early sculptural work showed the influence of Egyptian and Etruscan art, while his later figures placed greater emphasis on movement.

In the 1920s, Haller produced small-scale sculptures known as Tanagra figures, alongside his larger works. His portrait sculpture developed from depictions of friends in Rome and Paris toward more impressionistic studies of people close to him.

After the First World War, Haller became one of Switzerland’s most prominent sculptors and was also recognised in the wider German-speaking art world. His output included women's figures, portraits and architectural sculpture. Between 1909 and 1918, he received commissions for architectural sculpture in Zürich, Winterthur, Bern and Lucerne.

His Hans Waldmann monument in Zürich, created between 1933 and 1937, was one of the last major equestrian monuments in the classical tradition.

== Selected works ==
- Hans Waldmann Denkmal, 1937, bronze, Stadthausquai, Zürich
- Mädchen mit erhobenen Armen, 1939, bronze, Landiwiese, Zürich
- Schauende, 1923, bronze, Belvoir Park, Zürich
- Jüngling und Mädchen, 1914, stone, University of Zürich
- Fünf Nischenfiguren, 1909–1915, stone, façade of Kunsthaus Zürich

== Exhibitions ==
From 1909, Haller was a regular participant in group exhibitions at Kunsthaus Zürich. He had a solo exhibition at Paul Cassirer's gallery in Berlin in the same year. He and Cuno Amiet were selected as Switzerland's representatives at the Venice Biennale in 1934. Kunsthaus Zürich presented a memorial exhibition of Haller's work in 1951.

== Legacy ==
Haller's former studio on Höschgasse in Zürich, built in 1932, was donated to the City of Zürich by his heirs and is listed in the inventory of protected buildings.

== Gallery ==
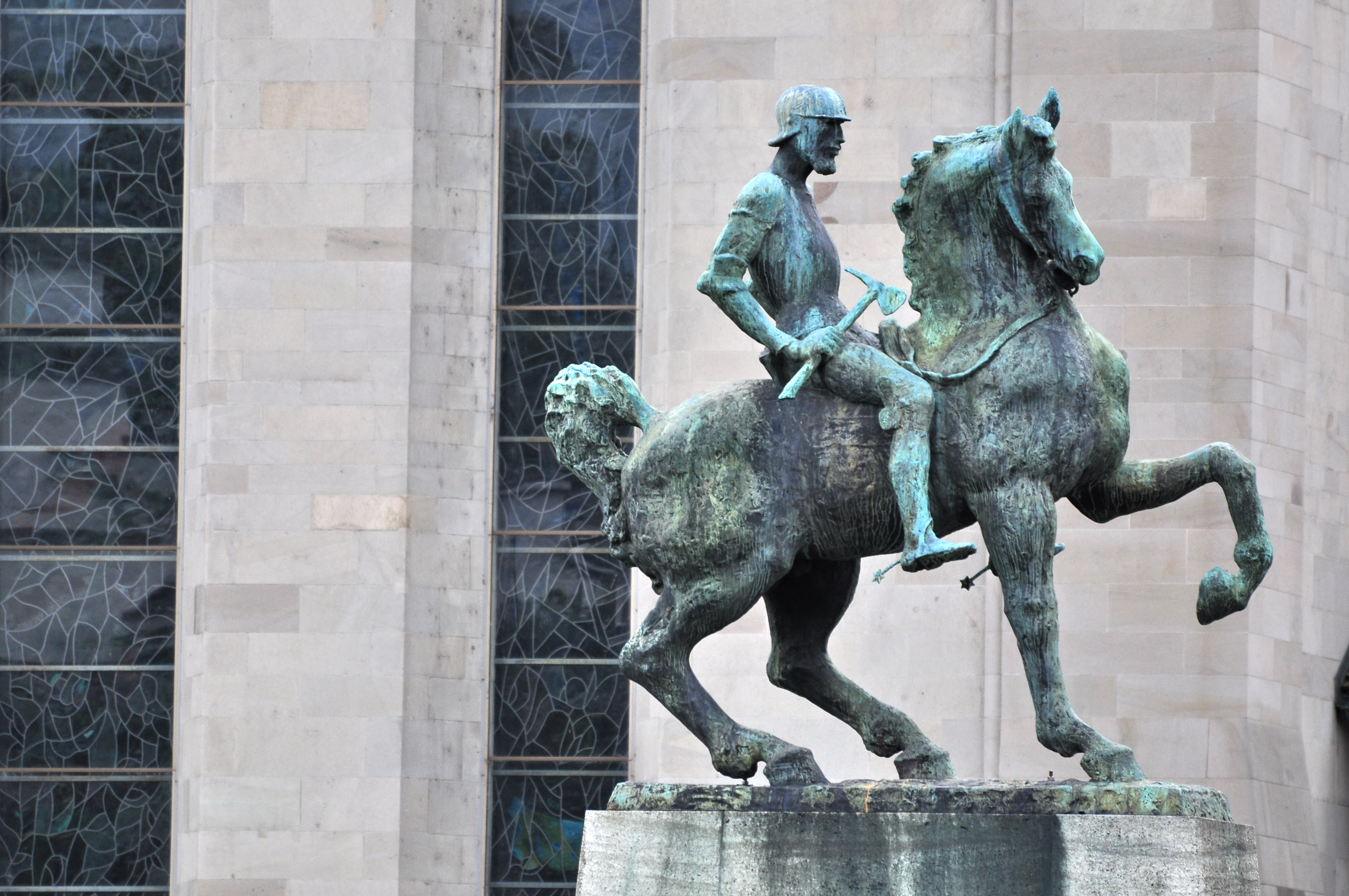
Hans Waldmann statue in Zürich, 1937

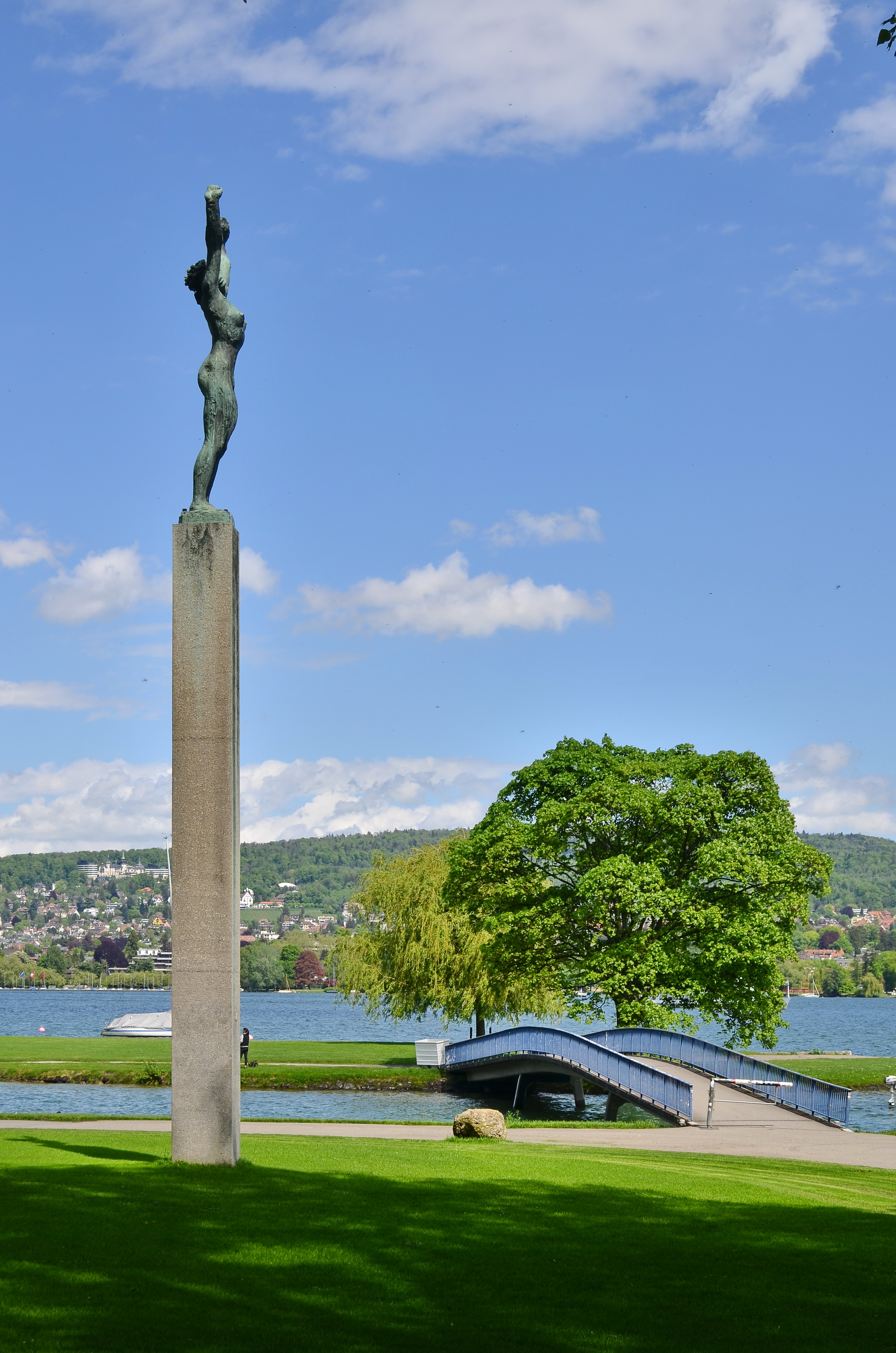
Mädchen mit erhobenen Armen in Zürich, 1939

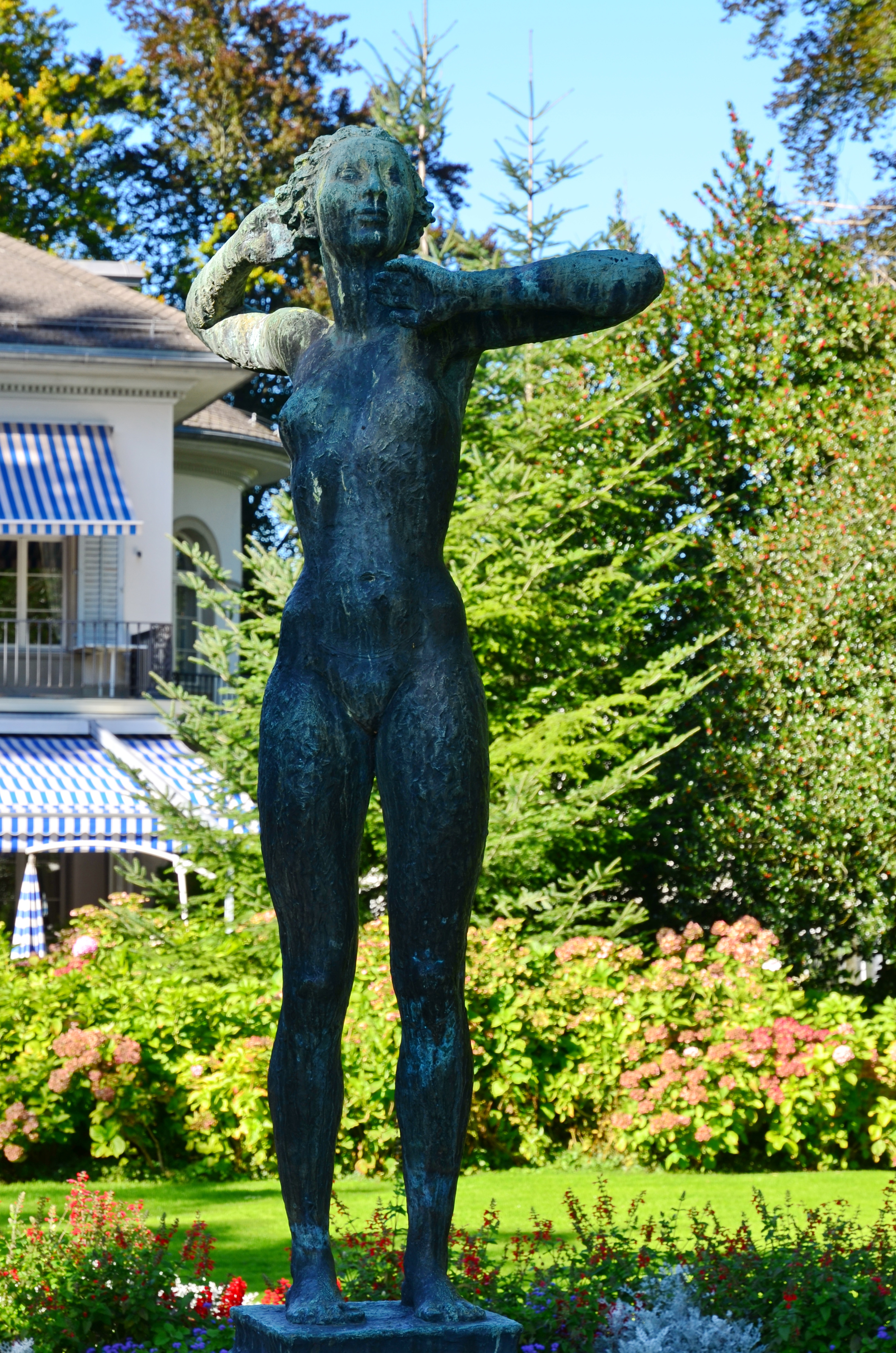
Schauende in Belvoirpark Zürich, 1923

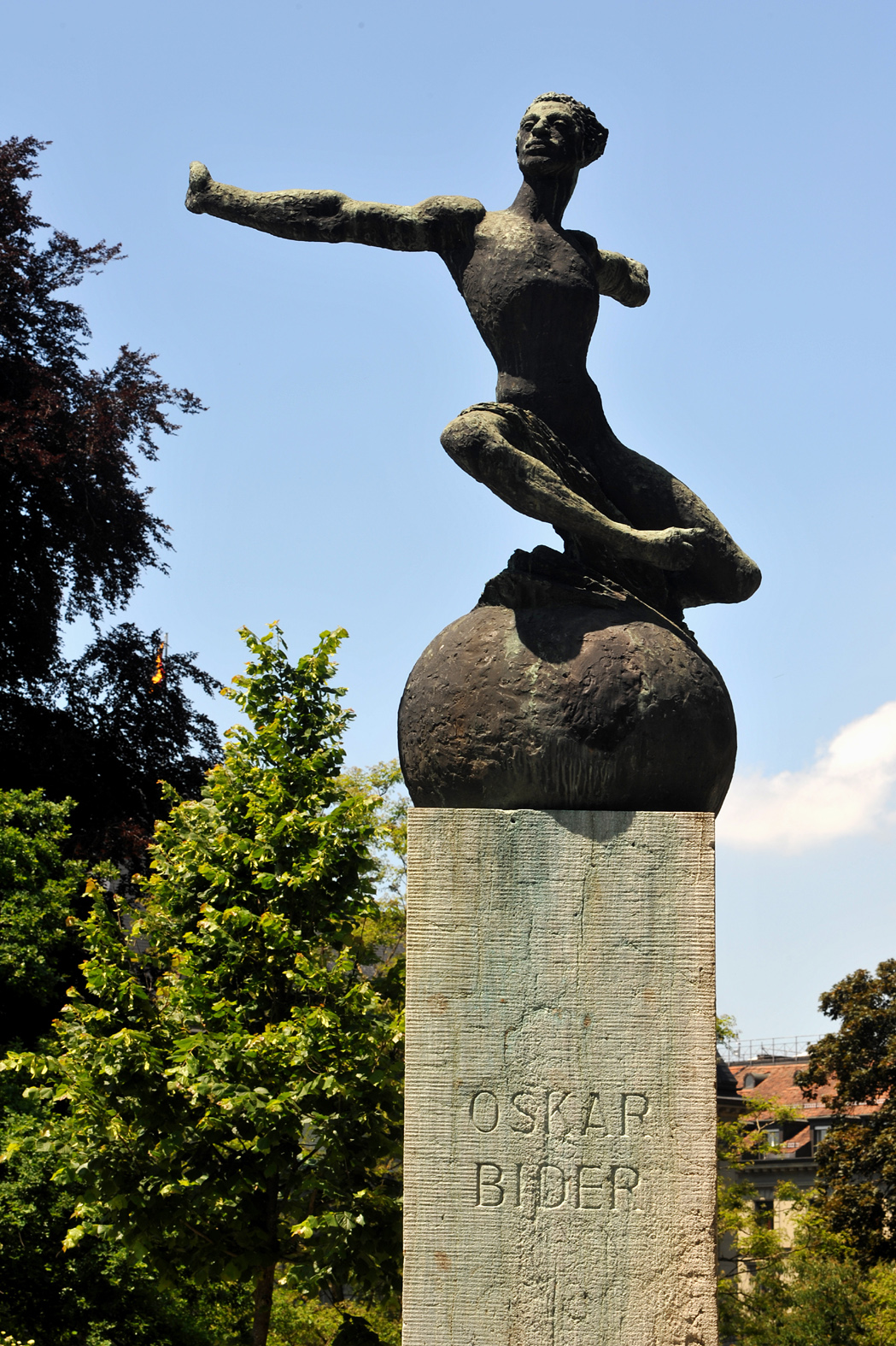
Oskar Bider memorial in Bern, 1924
