= Zunfthaus zur Waag =

Former municipal building in Zurich, Switzerland

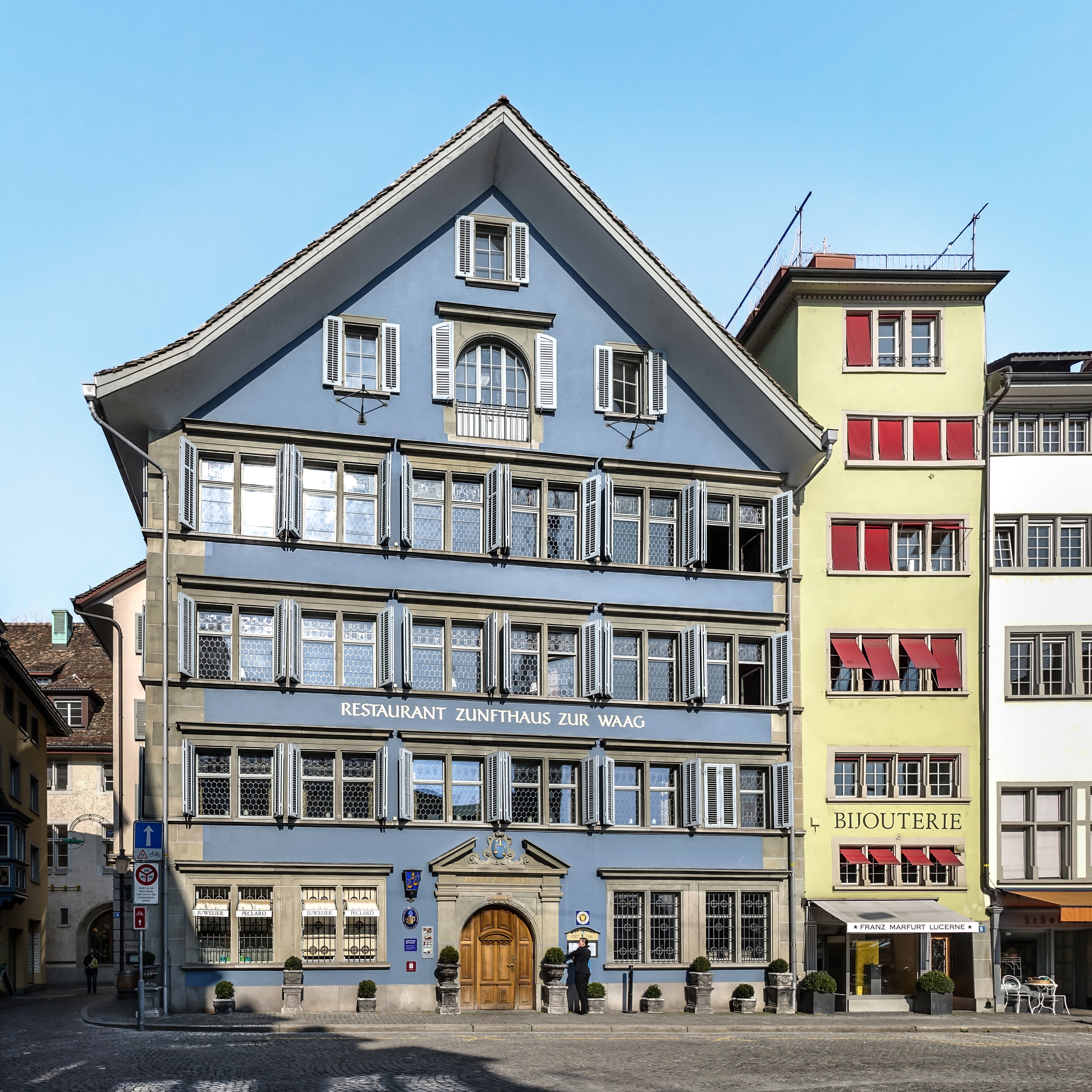
- Pictured in 2015

- Shown in Switzerland
- 47.37022°N 8.54033°E
- Location: Münsterhof, Zurich,

History
- Built: 1315 (711 years ago)

The Zunfthaus zur Waag, in Zurich, Switzerland, was the guild house of the Zunft zur Waag. Completed in 1315, it is one of the many historically valuable buildings in the city's Lindenhof quarter. It is situated on the northwestern side of Münsterhof, the largest public square in Zurich.

The building is now Restaurant Zunfthaus zur Waag.
