= Zunfthaus zur Haue =

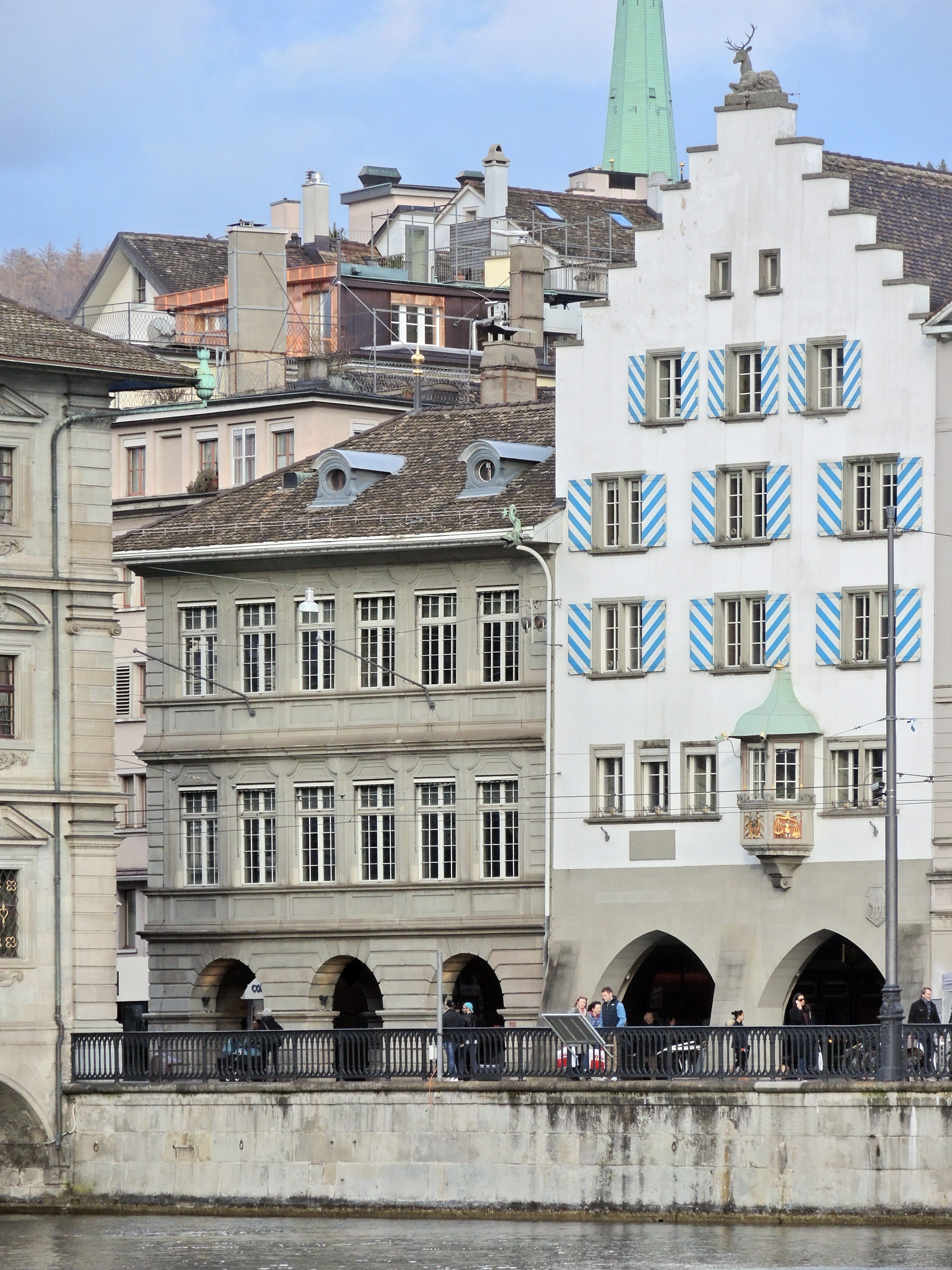
- Zunfthaus zur Haue and (to the left) Zunfthaus zur Saffran at Limmatquai as seen from towards Münsterhof
- Interactive map of Zunfthaus zur Haue
- 47°22′17″N 8°32′35″E
- Location: Limmatquai, Zürich

History
- Built: first mentioned in 1373

Site notes
- Architectural style: European Medieval
- Governing body: Zunft zum Kämbel

The Zunfthaus zur Haue or Haus zur Haue is situated at the Limmatquai promenade between Münsterbrücke and Rathausbrücke. It is the guild house of the Zunft zum Kämbel, meaning the guild of the merchants and traders. Neighbored by the Saffran, Zimmerleuten, and Rüden guild houses, it is one of the historically notable buildings in Zürich, Switzerland. The building also houses the relatively expensive restaurant of the same name.

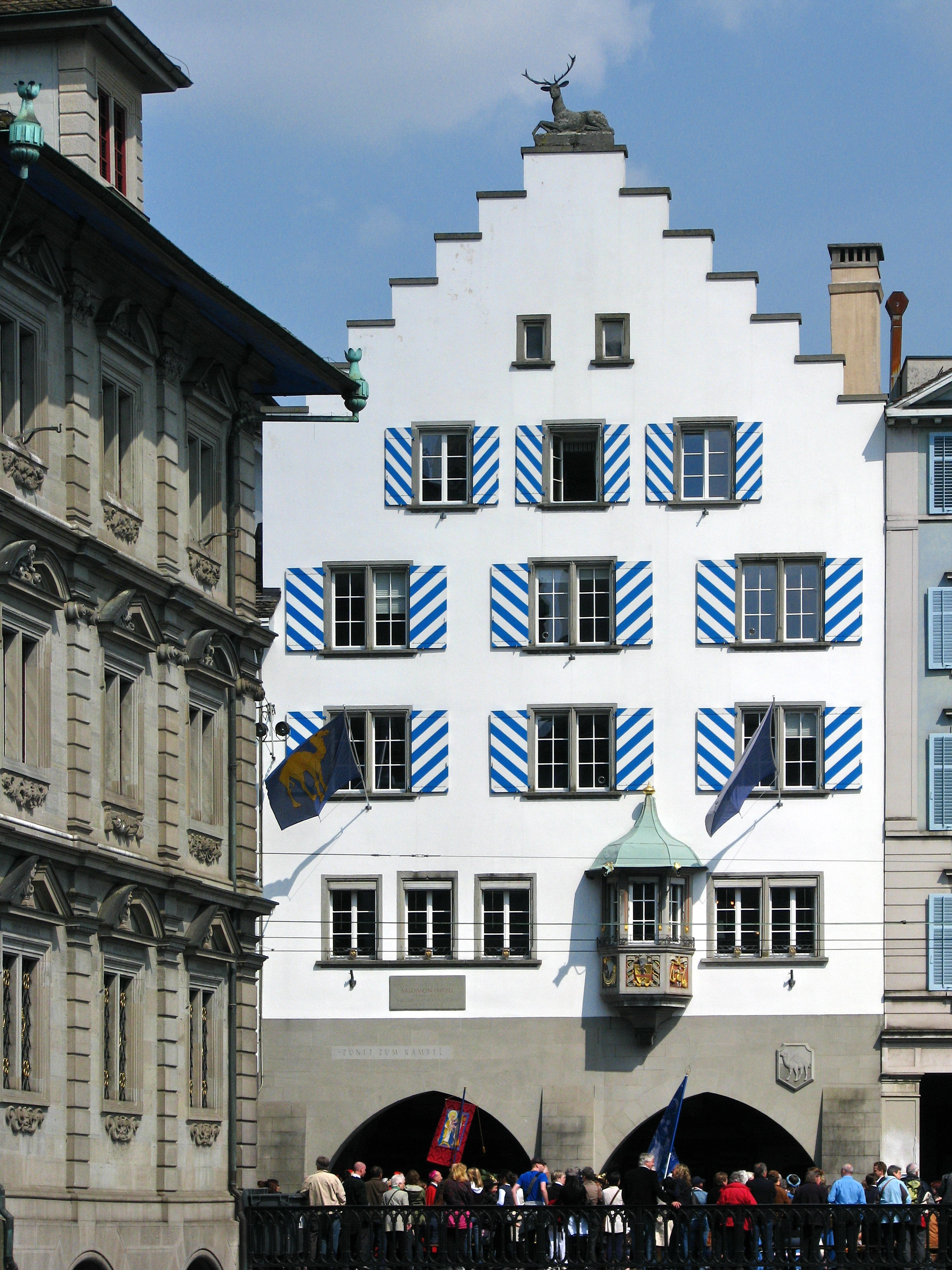
Guild house «zur Haue» decorated for Sechseläuten, Rathaus to the left side

== History ==
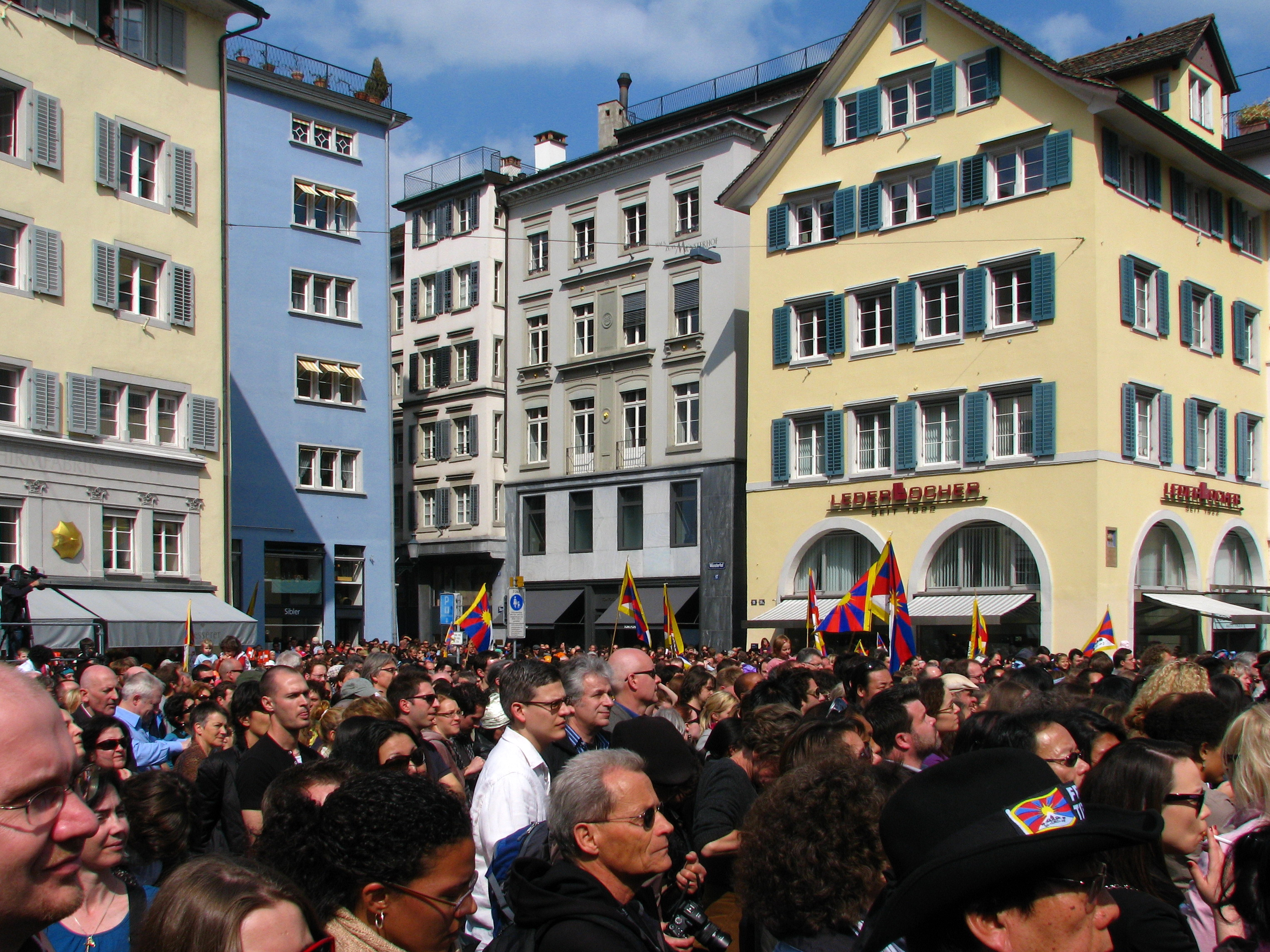
Former guild house at Münsterhof (to the right side)

Zunft zum Kämbel was originally a guild of food dealers and wine merchants. Its first Trinkstube (tavern and association meeting place) was located near the town hall. In 1358, the Zürich knight Götz Mülner II had sold sovereignty rights granted by Emperor Louis of Bavaria to the city of Zürich. The newly acquired possessions were administered by an Obervogt with its administration centre in the "Haue" building. Their guild house was first mentioned in a 1389 document as Kembel. In 1442 the building was in the possession of salt merchants, and from 1450 it was known as the "Salzlütenhus", "Houw", or "Salzhouw". The term Houw is derived from the axe featured on the salt merchant's coat of arms. In 1487 the guild acquired the House zum Kämbel which is still located at the Münsterhof 18. The siting at the Münsterhof plaza is seen as a deliberate distancing from the noble guild houses of the more prominent guilds in Zürich. In 1532, the cloth merchant Konrad Rollenbutz acquired the property and gave it to his two sons. From the second half of the 16th century, the "Haue" was in the possession of Salomon Hirzel-Rollenbutz (1544–1605) and his son, the Zürich mayor Salomon Hirzel (1580–1652). In 1781, the building was the home of Rudolf Hirzel Rordorf-Sprüngli. The Haue building was sold to the colonial goods merchant Beckert, being its last private owner, in 1878. On 31 May 1956 – 150 years after its formal dissolution – the newly established Gesellschaft zum Kämbel bought the Haue building. Since 1980, it has housed a restaurant (Weinstube).

== Architecture ==
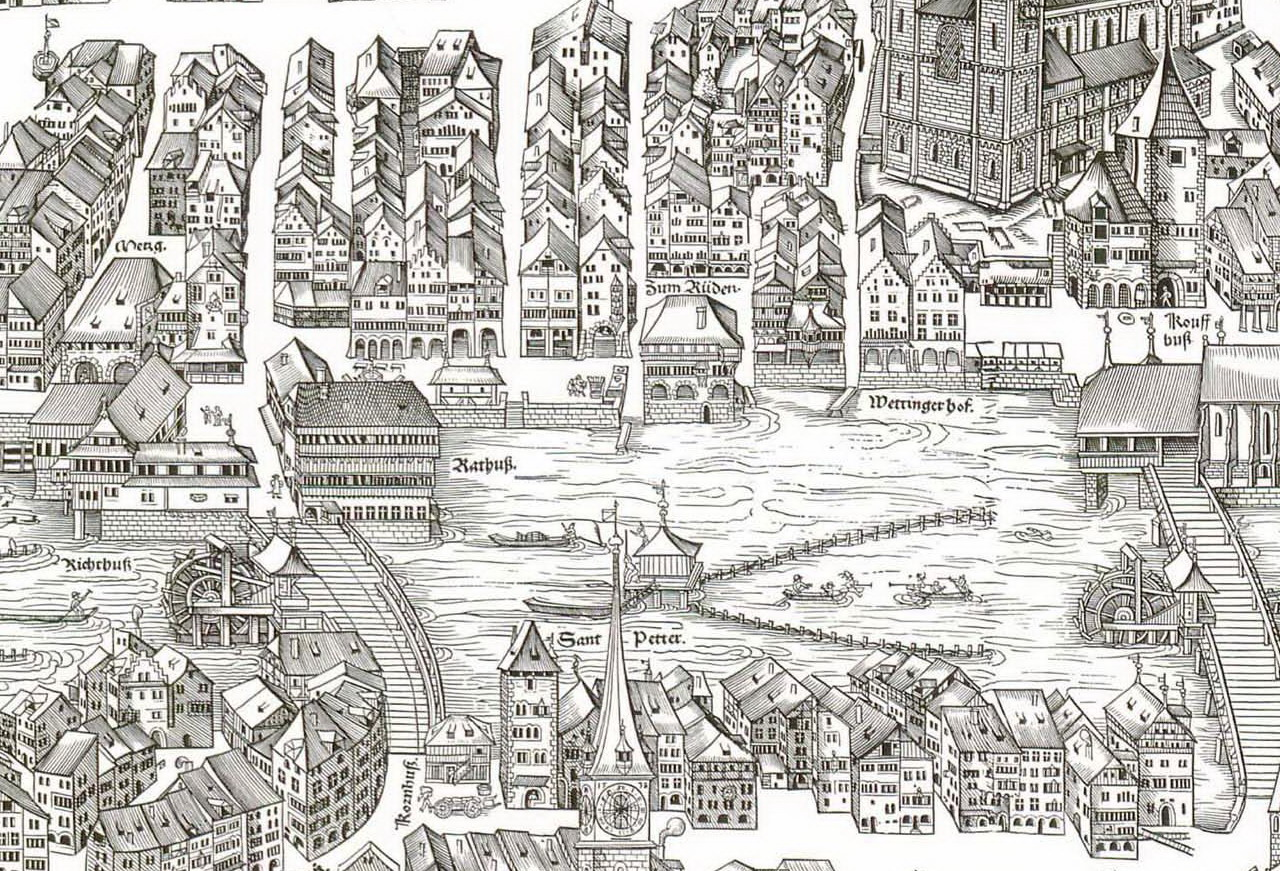
Murerplan, cut

The present "Haue" building at the Limmatquai was originally an ensemble of three formerly separate buildings: the upper and lower "Wetzwilerhus", first mentioned in 1373, and the "Ropoltzhus". All three were later rebuilt into the complex that is the building as it exists today. The buildings near the town hall at the present Limmatquai were among the most desirable private houses, the town hall being not only the political but also the economic center of the city. A memorial plate and the deer on the roof are reminiscent of times when the family of Salomon Hirzel was the owner of the house.

On the Murerplan of 1576, the building can be seen on the right shore of the Limmat, north of the Haus zum Rüden, on the so-called Reichsstrasse (imperial street) which later formed the present Limmatquai. Around 1878, the colonial goods merchant Beckert rebuilt the facade and decorated it with painted ornaments and Gothic windows. The prominent crow-stepped gables were built by Beckert's nephew, Albert Beckert-Irniger. The guild hall on the first floor was renovated by the architect Armin Meili in 1979, and a restaurant was established in 1980.

== Gallery ==
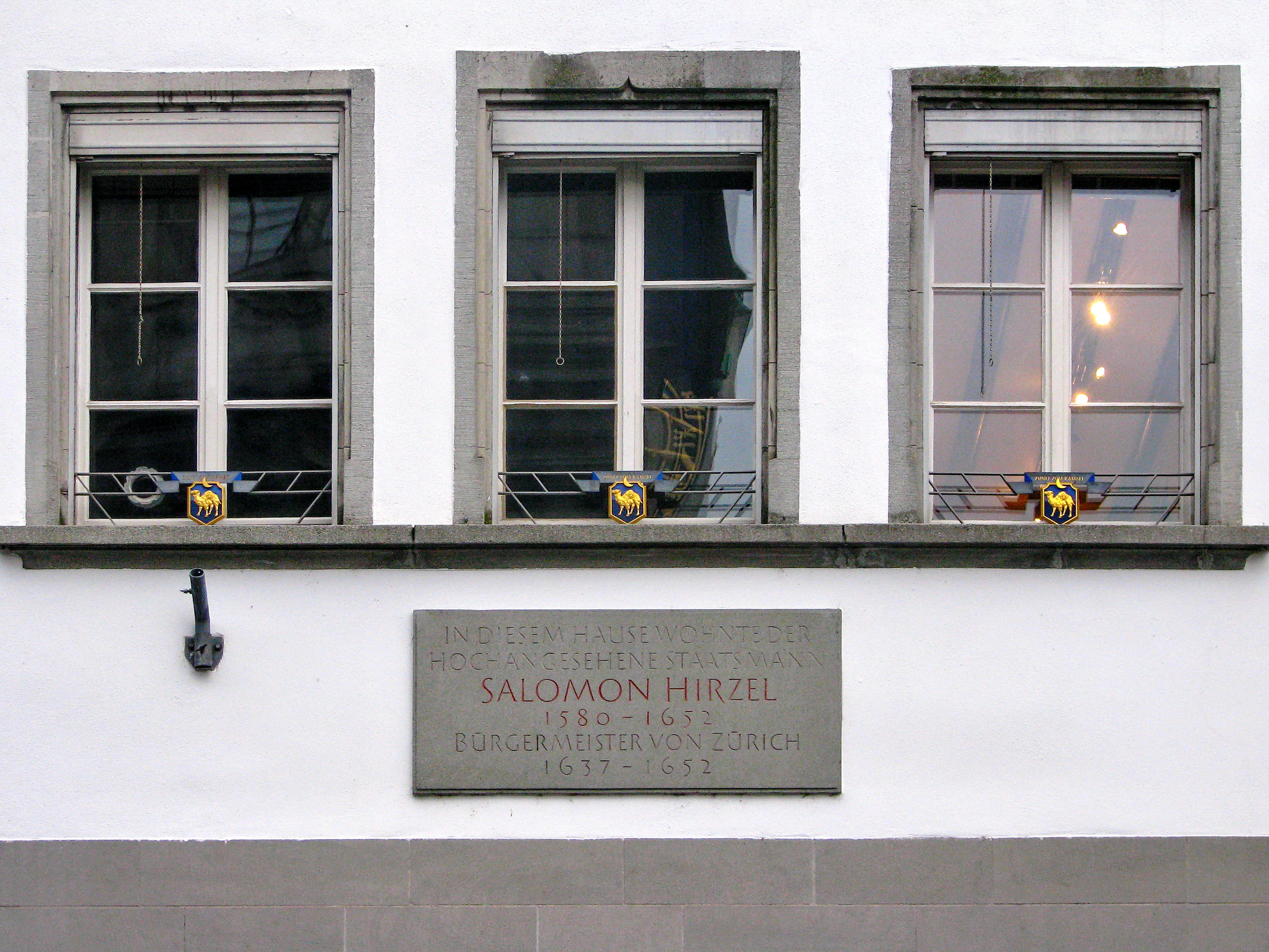
Memorial plate

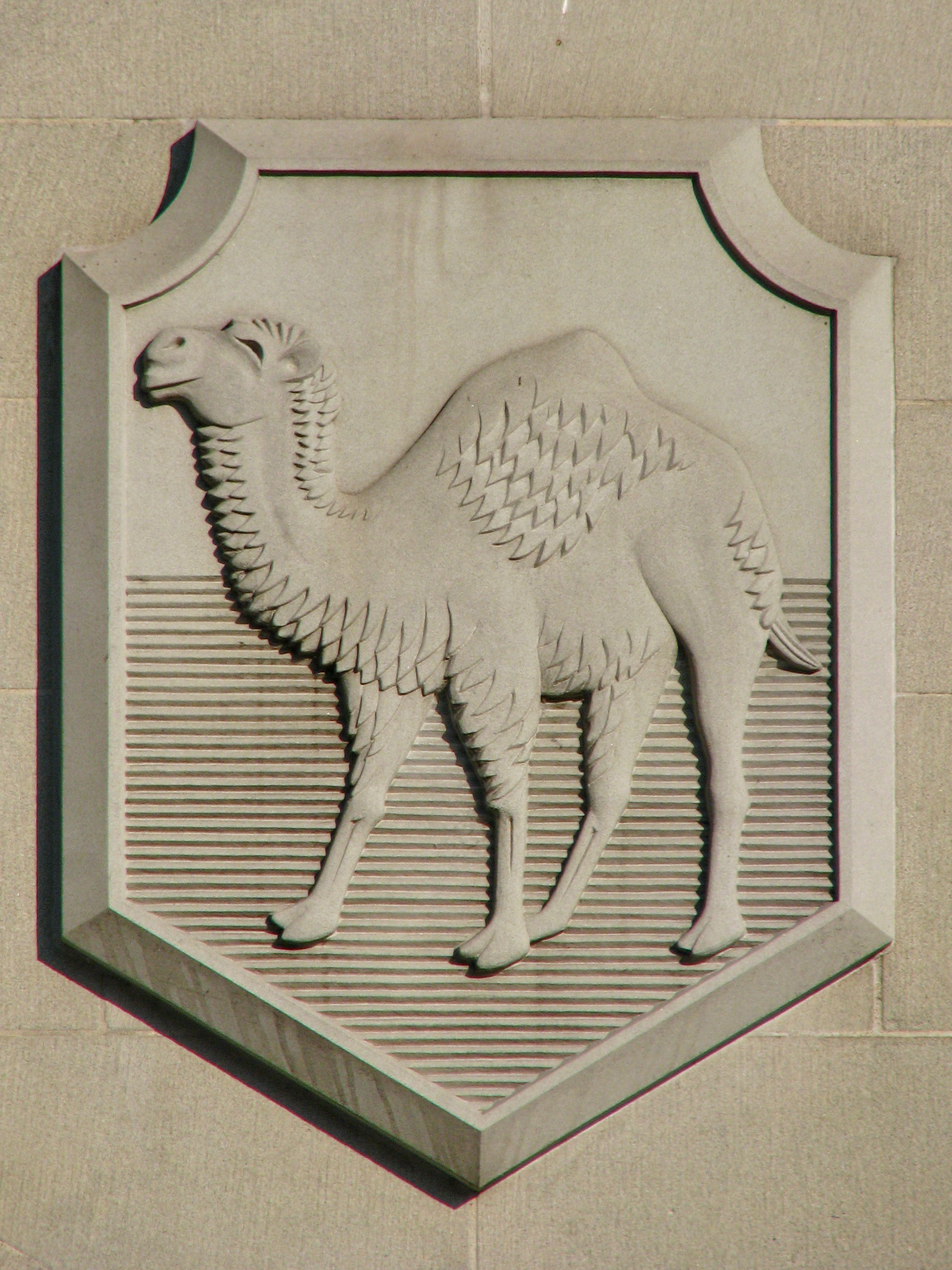
Heraldic shield

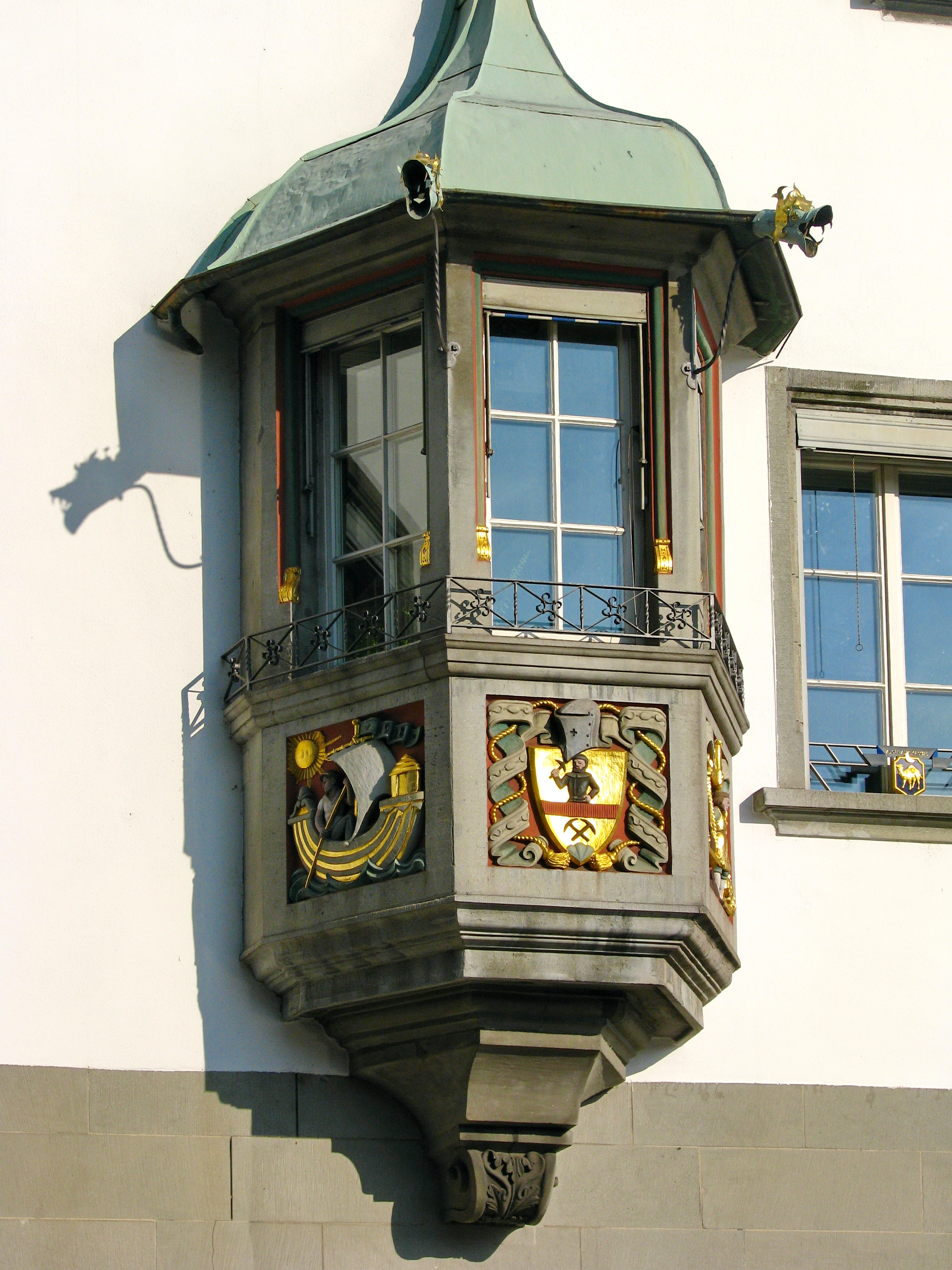
Bay window with salt merchants' coat of arms

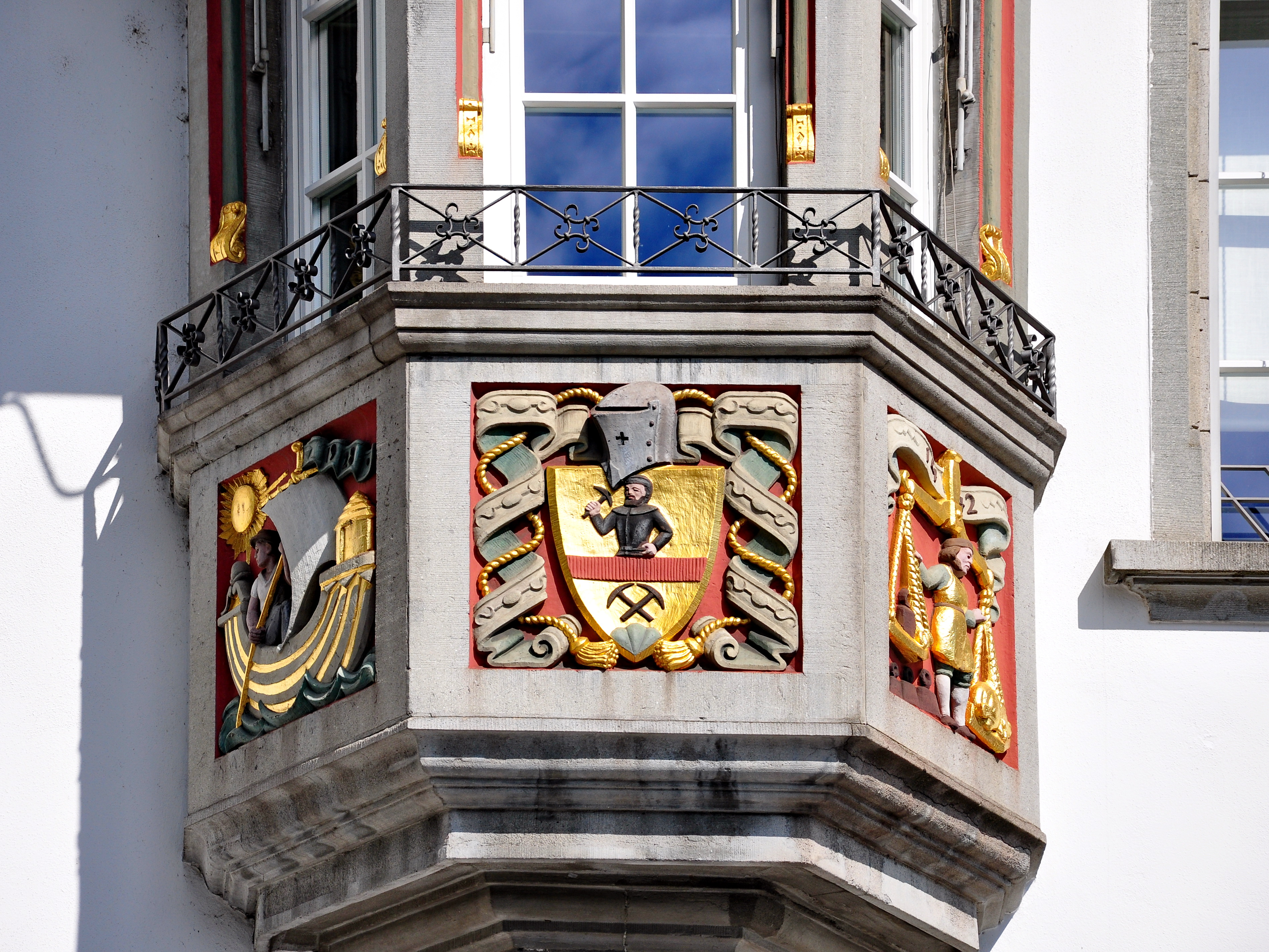
Bay window, details

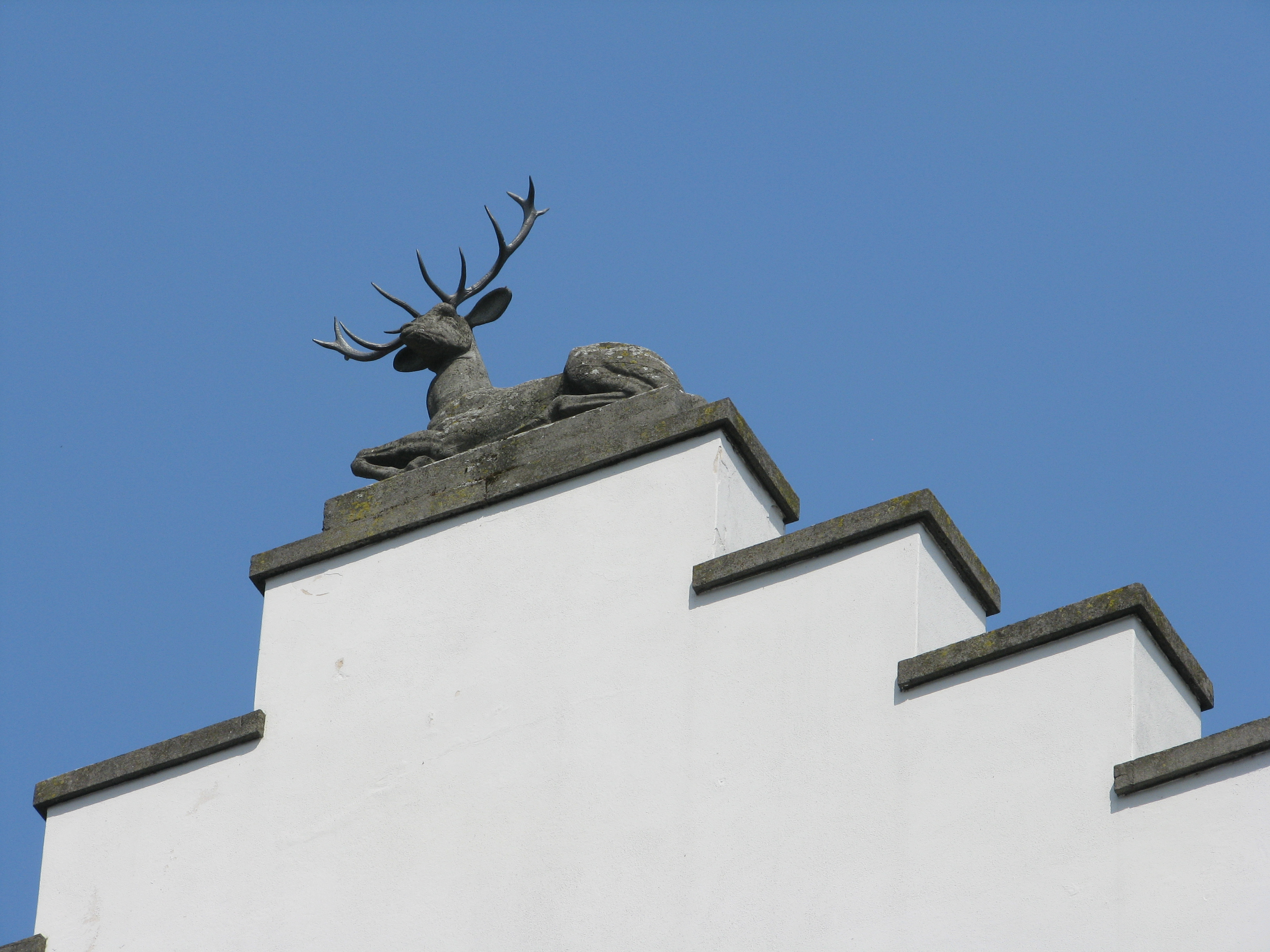
Crow-stepped gables with rooftop deer

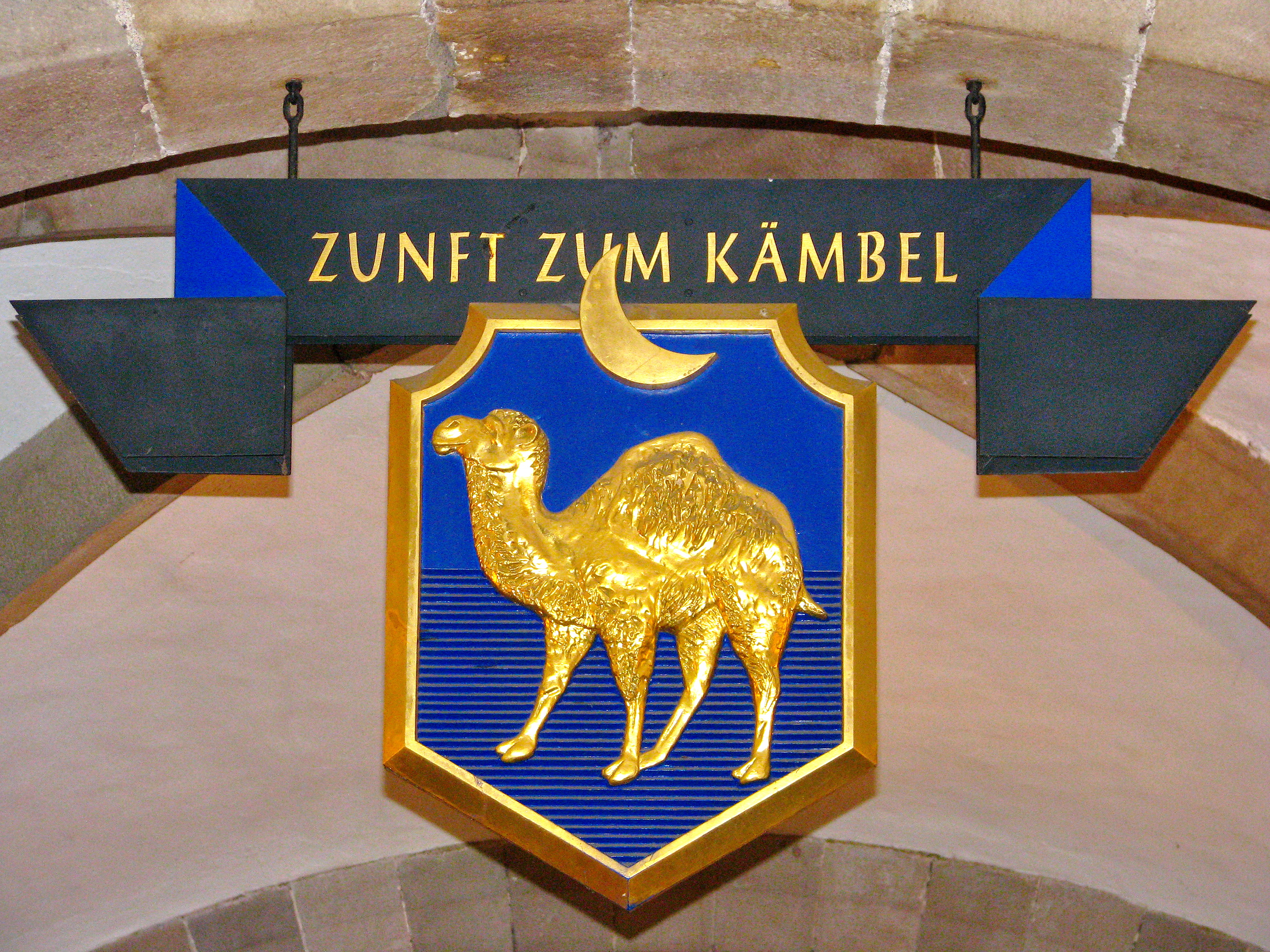
Kämbel guild's coat of arms at Limmatquai

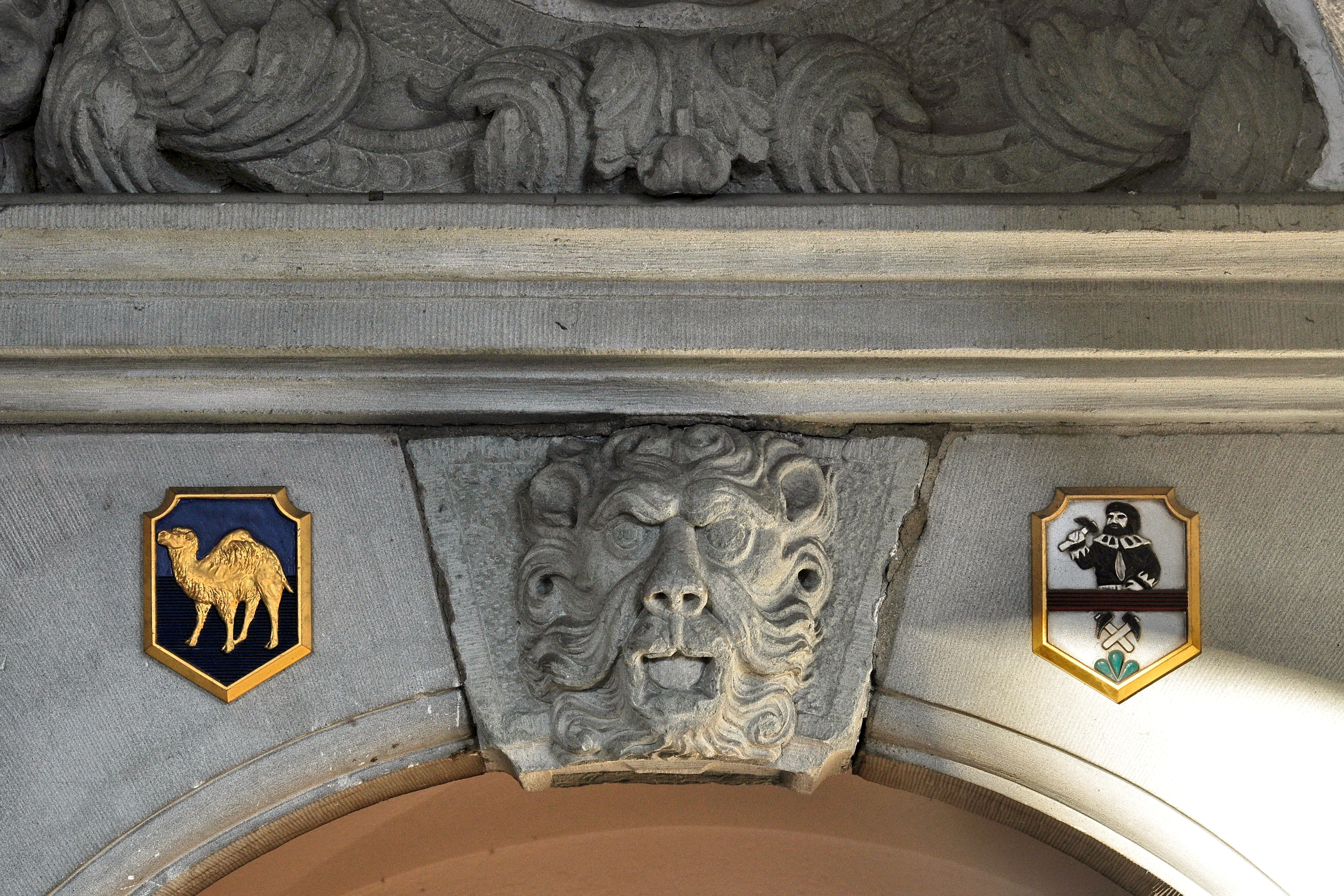
Restaurant entrance

== Literature ==
- Markus Brühlmeier, Beat Frei: Das Zürcher Zunftwesen. 2 Bände, NZZ Buchverlag, Zürich, 2005. ISBN 3-03823-171-1
