= Zünfte of Zurich =

One of 14 historical guilds

There are fourteen historical Zünfte (guilds, singular Zunft) of Zurich, under the system established in 1336 with the "guild revolution" of Rudolf Brun. They are the 13 guilds that predated 1336, plus the Gesellschaft zur Constaffel, originally consisting of the city's nobles.

== Guilds founded in 1336 ==
There have been two mergers of historical guilds since, so that there are 12 contemporary Zünfte continuing the medieval guilds:

| Name | Coat of arms | Description | Guild house | Website |
|---|---|---|---|---|
| Gesellschaft zur Constaffel | Gesellschaft zur Constaffel | Originally members of the nobility. From 6 December 1490 ("Constaffelbrief") until 1798, all adult Zurich citizens (including women), not belonging to another guild. | Haus zum Rüden | Website |
| Zunft zur Saffran | Zunft zur Saffran | Originally merchants of textiles and spices | Zunfthaus zur Saffran | Website |
| Zunft zur Meisen | Zunft zur Meisen | Originally innkeepers, saddle makers and painters | Zunfthaus zur Meisen | Website |
| Zunft zur Schmiden | Zunft zur Schmiden | Originally blacksmiths, silver- and goldsmiths, clockmakers and physicians | Zunfthaus Zur Schmiden | Website |
| Zunft zum Weggen | Zunft zum Weggen | Originally bakers and millers | Restaurant Weisser Wind | Website |
| Vereinigte Zünfte zur Gerwe und zur Schuhmachern | Vereinigte Zünfte zur Gerwe und zur Schuhmachern | Formerly two guilds, tanners and shoemakers, united in 1877 | Hotel Savoy | Website |
| Zunft zum Widder | Zunft zum Widder | Originally butchers and cattle merchants | Widder Hotel | Website |
| Zunft zur Zimmerleuten | Zunft zur Zimmerleuten | Originally carpenters, builders, wainmakers | Zunfthaus zur Zimmerleuten | Website |
| Zunft zur Schneidern | Zunft zur Schneidern | Originally tailors | Zunfthaus Zum Königstuhl | Website |
| Zunft zur Schiffleuten | Zunft zur Schiffleuten | Originally fishermen and boatmen | Hotel zum Storchen | Website |
| Zunft zum Kämbel | Zunft zum Kämbel | Originally food dealers, wine merchants | Zunfthaus zur Haue | Website |
| Zunft zur Waag | Zunft zur Waag | Two separate guilds, the linen weavers (Zunft der Leinenweber) and the wool weavers (Zunft der Wollweber), united in 1440. The new guild took the name of its house and became the Zunft zur Waag. Since then, it brought together the wool and linen weavers, the hatters and the linen merchants | Zunfthaus zur Waag | Website |

== 19th century guilds ==
In the 19th century, with the expansion of Zurich, incorporating various formerly separate villages, a number of new "guilds" were established to represent these. By this time the old guilds had ceased to be tied to specific trades and had acquired a mostly folkloristic and societal function, uniting the upper strata of old and well-to-do clans of Zurich.

| | Coats of arms | Description | Founded in | Guild house | Website |
|---|---|---|---|---|---|
| Stadtzunft | Stadtzunft | Guild of the City of Zurich (Altstadt) | 1867 | Hotel Marriott (Zunftstube) | Website |
| Zunft Riesbach | Zunft Riesbach | Guild of Riesbach quarter | 1887 | Restaurant Zum Grünen Glas | Website |
| Zunft Fluntern | Zunft Fluntern | Guild of Fluntern quarter | 1895 | Kunsthaus Zürich, Vortragssaal; Kunsthaus Restaurant during Sechseläuten | Website |
| Zunft zu den Drei Königen | Zunft zu den Drei Königen | Guild of Enge quarter | 1897 | Kongresshaus, Dreikönigsaal | |
| Zunft Hottingen | Zunft Hottingen | Guild of Hottingen quarter | 1897 | Zunfthaus Am Neumarkt | Website |
| Zunft zu Wiedikon | Zunft zu Wiedikon | Guild of Wiedikon quarter | 1897 | Gasthof zum Falken/Falcone | Website |
| Zunft Wollishofen | Zunft Wollishofen | Guild of Wollishofen quarter | 1900 | Restaurant Belvoirpark | |
| Zunft Hard | Zunft Hard | Guild of the Aussersihl and Hard quarters | 1922 | Restaurant Werdguet | Website |
| Zunft zu Oberstrass | Zunft zu Oberstrass | Guild of Oberstrass quarter | 1925 | Taverne zur Linde | Website |
| Zunft St. Niklaus | Zunft St. Niklaus | Guild of the Affoltern, Oerlikon and Seebach quarters | 1933 | Restaurant Carlton | Website |
| Zunft Höngg | Zunft Höngg | Guild of Höngg quarter | 1934 | Restaurant Mülihalde/Desperado | Website |
| Zunft zur Letzi | Zunft zur Letzi | Guild of the Altstetten and Albisrieden quarters | 1934 | Restaurant Letzistube / Zum Turm | Website |
| Zunft Schwamendingen | Zunft Schwamendingen | Guild of Schwamendingen quarter | 1975 | Gasthof Hirschen, Hotel Glockenhof during Sechseläuten | Website |
| Zunft Witikon | Zunft Witikon | Guild of Witikon quarter | 1980 | Restaurant Elefant (Zunftstube), Hotel Schweizerhof during Sechseläuten | Website |

== See also ==
- Sechseläuten
- History of Zurich
- Gesellschaft zu Fraumünster
