= Hans Waldmann (mayor) =

Swiss politician (1435–1489)

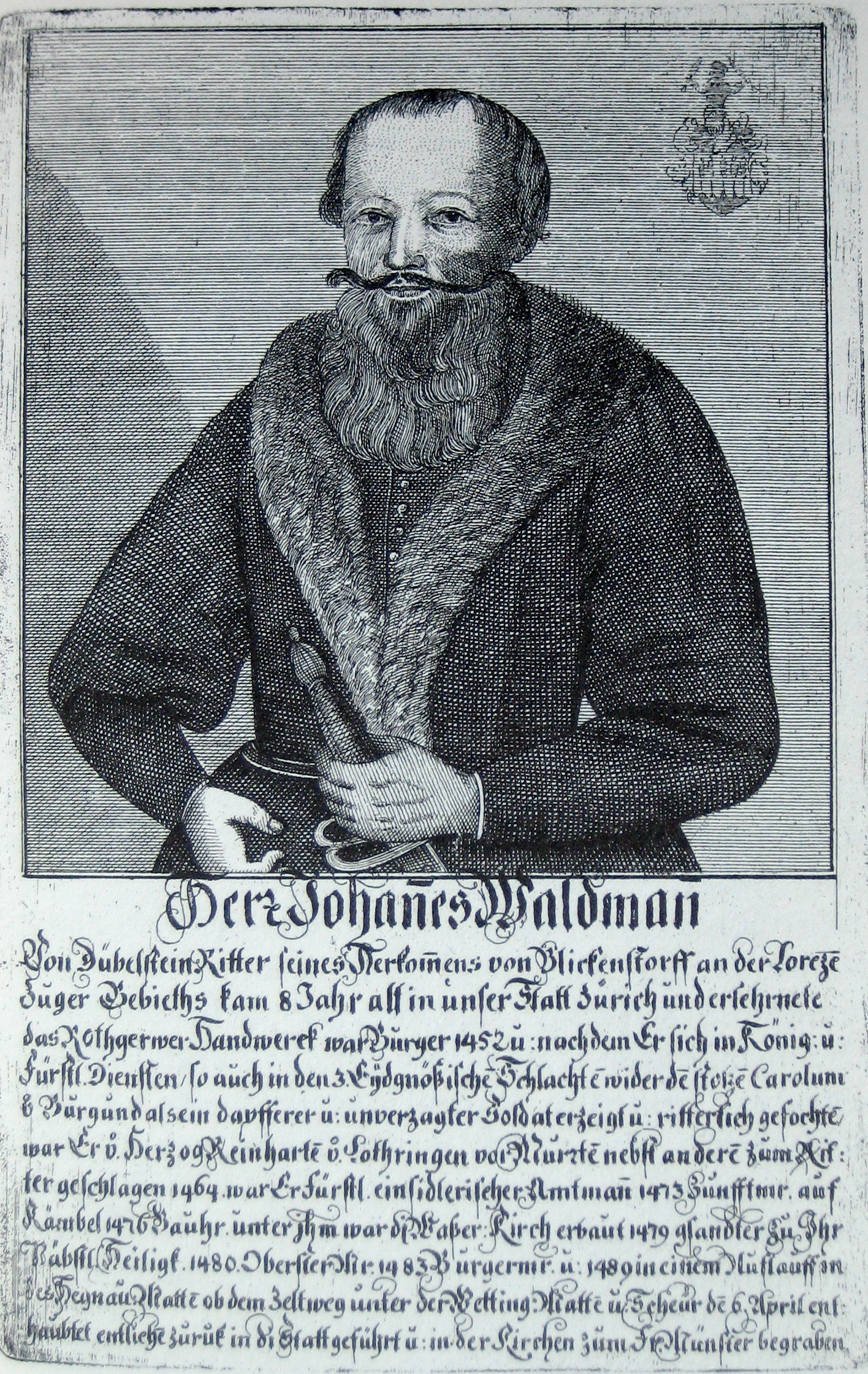
Portrait of Hans Waldmann, late 17th century

Hans Waldmann (1435 – 6 April 1489) was mayor of Zurich and a Swiss military leader. Born in Blickensdorf near Zug, he married well and became Squire of Dubelstein. He served as Mayor of Zurich between 1483–1489 and was beheaded on the 6 April 1489 following a peasant revolt.

== Life ==
=== Early years ===
Born in the year 1435 in Blickensdorf (now part of Baar), Hans Waldmann grew up in economically favourable circumstances. Little is known about his father, who presumably died in 1436. His mother, née Katharina Schweiger, was the daughter of a salt merchant from Lucerne, who had already acquired citizenship in Zurich in 1409, and inherited his significant fortune. It can hardly have been the financial pressure, but rather the choice of the parents that sent Waldmann to a tailor's apprenticeship before a second attempt at a tanner. In 1452 Waldmann together with his brother Heini and younger stepbrother Hensli Truttmann acquired citizenship in Zurich, but it is not known when the family moved to Zurich. In his youth he was involved in a variety of fights, insults and arguments. Together with his brother Heini, Waldmann also took part in a Freischarzzug in Konstanz and Kempten in 1458 and 1460. In the same year he ran as an ensign before the Zurich contingent, which conquered Thurgau with the Confederates. By marrying Anna Landolt, the widow of the Einsiedeln Amtmann – or bailiff – Ulrich Edlibach, Waldmann not only secured a considerable fortune, but also access to the family iron trade and even the position of Amtmann of the Einsiedeln monastery.

=== Early political and military career ===
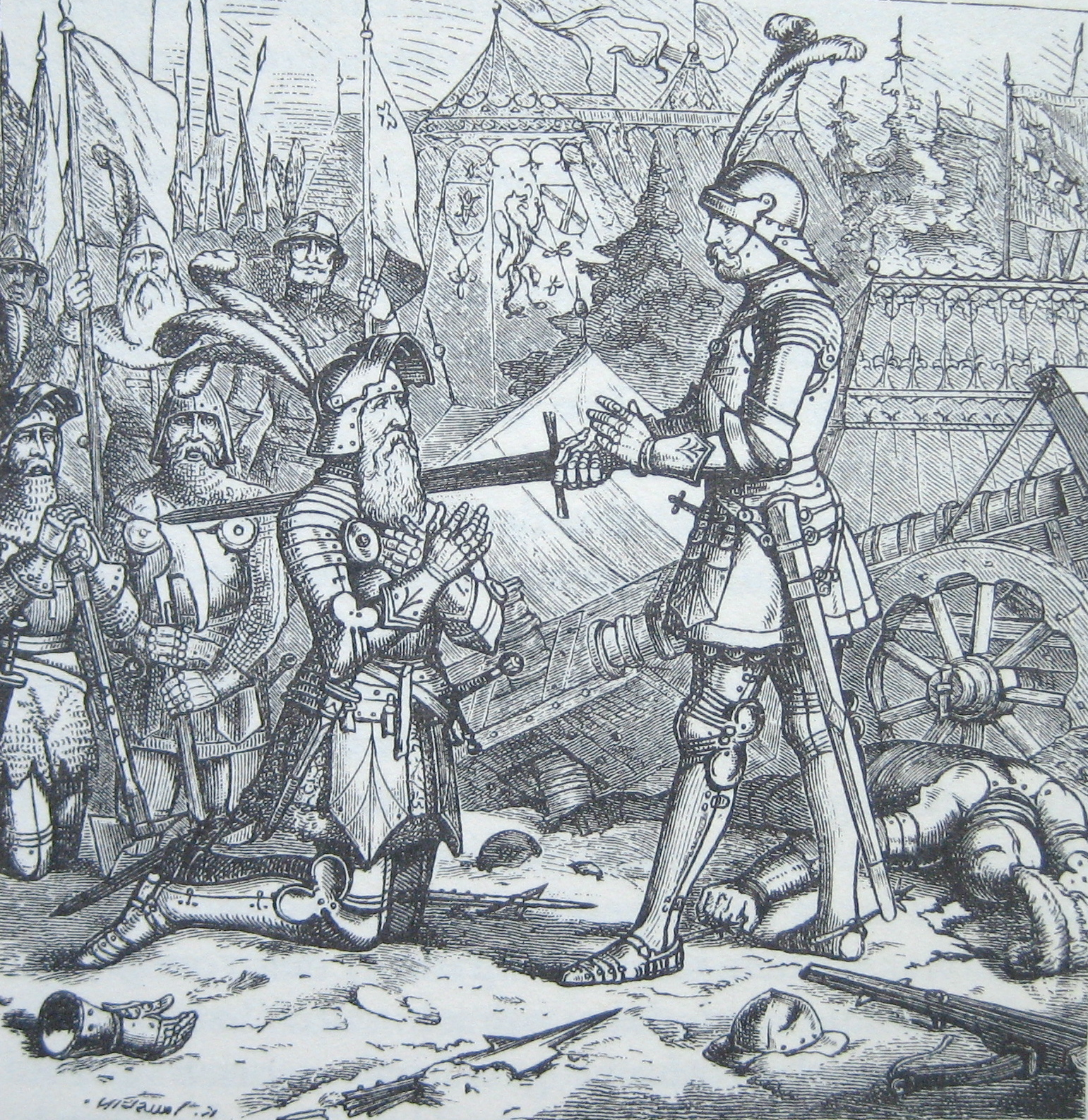
Knighting of Hans Waldmann before the Battle of Morat in June 1476

Waldmann was elected to the city court, and thus into his first municipal office, in 1466. In the same year, however, his election as guild master in the tanner's guild was canceled by the Zunftmeisterkollegium – the guild masters' college. But Waldmann did not seem to have been entirely without political support, because six years later, in 1473, he was elected to the guild master of the Kämbel guild and thus to the small council.

Waldmann lead the Confederates in the Burgundian Wars, defeating Charles the Bold with an army estimated at 12,000 men gaining fame and a significant reputation in Zurich and the Swiss Confederacy. The influence of his seat in the Small Council and his reputation, which he gained in the Burgundian Wars, led to numerous pensions with which he could enrich himself. Shortly after the Battle of Morat, before which he was knighted, Waldmann received a pension of 100 guilders from Archduke Sigismund of Austria. From 1476 he also took part in legation trips and meetings and thus increased his diplomatic reputation. In 1480 he was elected chief guild master, i.e. the highest guild master, and finally in 1483 mayor.

=== Mayor of Zurich and his downfall ===
During his tenure as mayor, Waldmann was probably one of the most influential and certainly the richest confederate of his time and was at the height of his power. Abroad, too, he was increasingly perceived as an influential politician due to his increased participation in meetings and federal diplomatic trips. This led to numerous pensions from foreign princes who wanted to influence the policy of the Confederation in favor of their interests. The Duke of Milan, Ludovico Sforza, Sigismund the Archduke of Austria, the Holy Roman Emperor Maximilian I and Louis XI of France should be mentioned here. They awarded Waldmann large sums every year and used him as a further pension distributor and representative within the Swiss Confederation. In return, the influential mayor of Zurich was supposed to stand up for the interests of his patrons in Zurich and federal politics. The financial means provided by his patrons and the thus enabled connections allowed Waldmann almost full control over all political activities in Zurich. His sphere of influence wasn't only limited to the area around Zurich, but also federal politics. For example, during the conflict between the Duke of Milan and the Bishop of Sion, Waldmann was able to influence the decision of the federal arbitration tribunal in such a way that it spoke out in favour of Milan on almost all counts.

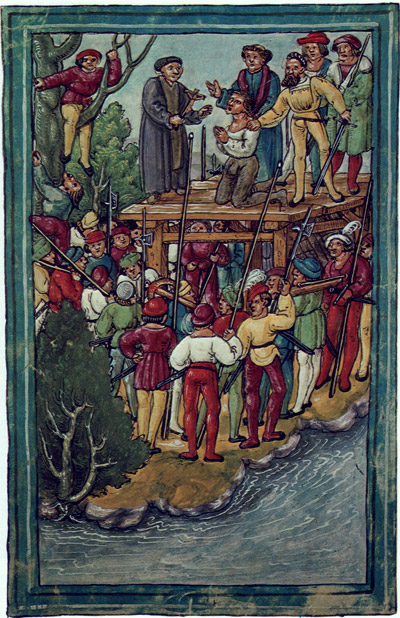
Execution of Hans Waldmann (Luzerner Schilling, 1515)

His reputation, however, started to decline as he was accused, among other things, of having betrayed the federal troops to Milan. Furthermore, his zeal for reform and the driving back of the Constaffel resulted in more and more opposition. The order to have the allegedly poaching farm dogs killed culminated in a peasant uprising that could only be resolved through federal mediation. However, after the mediation Waldmann had the agreement with the peasants rewritten (i.e. falsified), which led to another uprising, in which large parts of the urban population rose up. Waldmann was captured and, after several days of torture, executed on April 6, 1489. Before the execution, the rebellious people accused him, among other things, of worrying only about the interests of his foreign patrons. Not only had their mayor caused the death sentence of allied confederates through the betrayal of a campaign in Valais and Lucerne, but now he even wanted to leave their city to the emperor so that the county of Kyburg could be handed over to him. Waldmann was beheaded following accusations of financial corruption, foreign connections and sodomy.

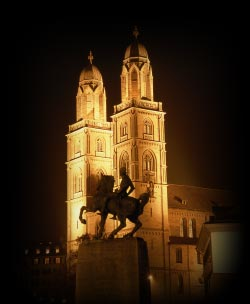
The Grossmünster with the 1937 equestrian monument to Hans Waldmann

=== Equestrian monument ===
The equestrian monument at the Münsterhof plaza in front of the Fraumünster church (47.3698°N 8.5421°E) at the Münsterbrücke crossing of the River Limmat was unveiled on 6 April 1937 by the Kämbel guild, aiming to rehabilitate Waldmann who they proposed had been the victim of a judicial murder. It was the subject of controversy for artistic reasons, deemed by conservative critics as being overly modern for the historical city centre.

== Gallery ==
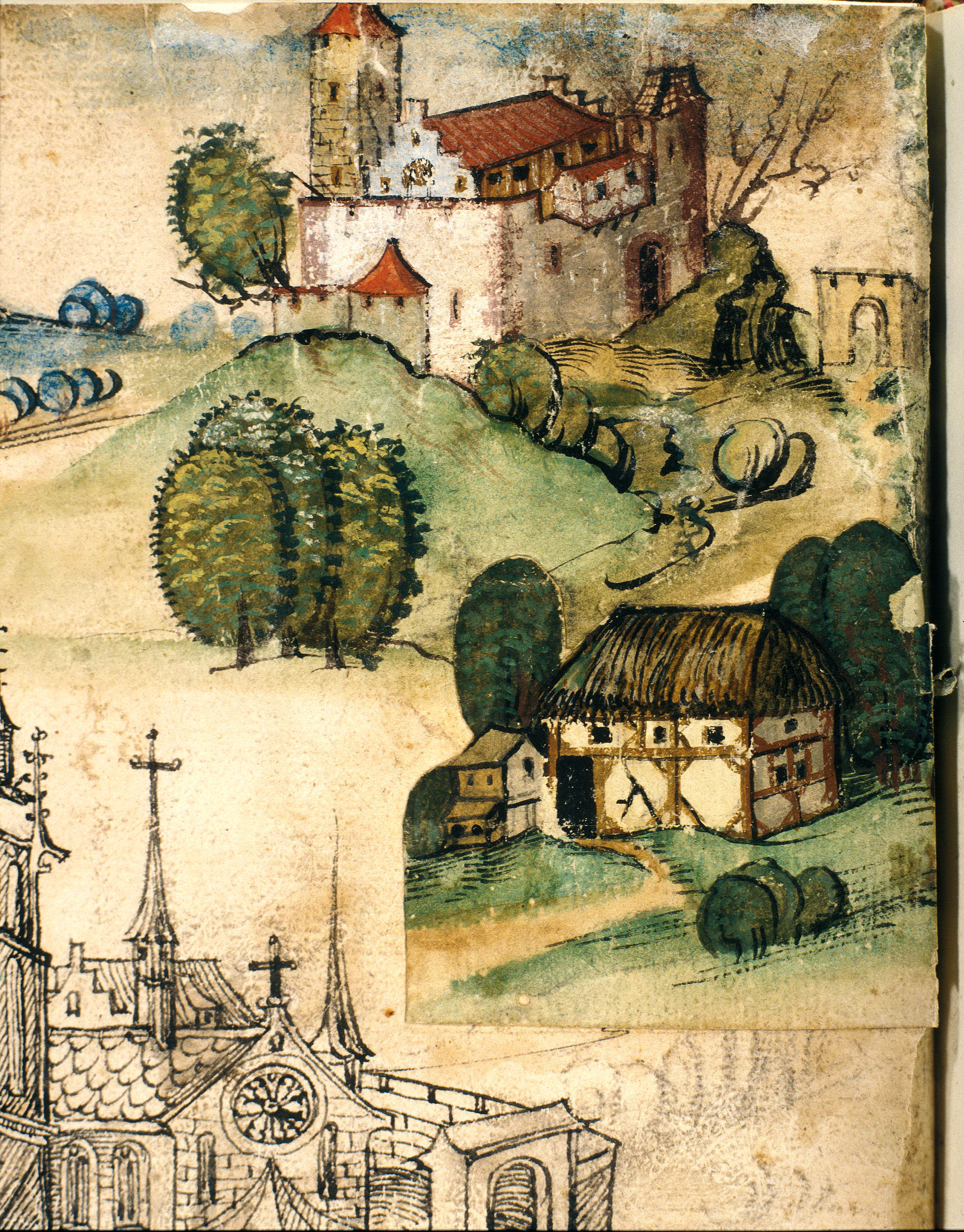
Castle Dübelstein, Dübendorf

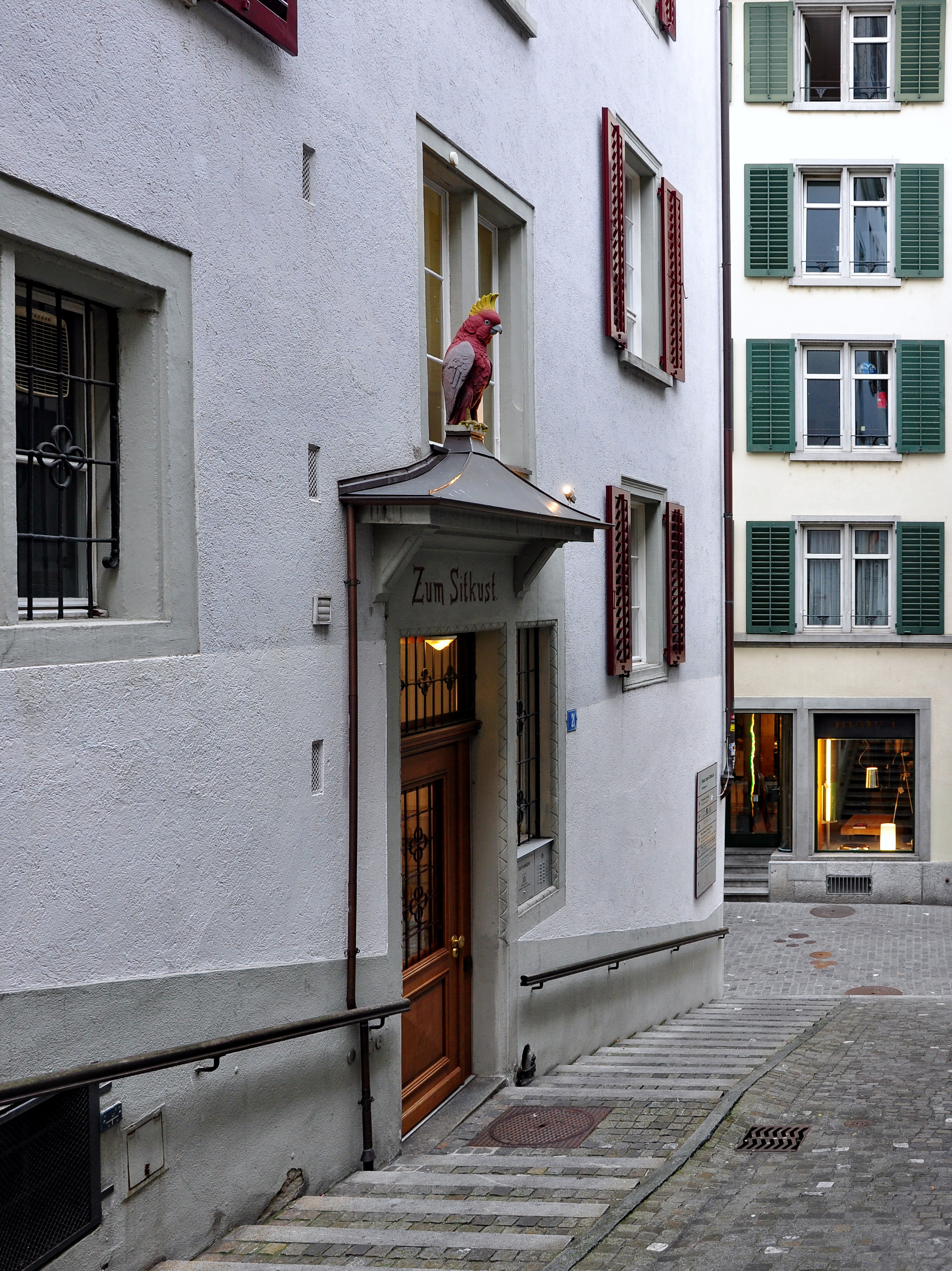
«Haus zum Sitkust» (Trittligasse), former home of Hans Waldmann

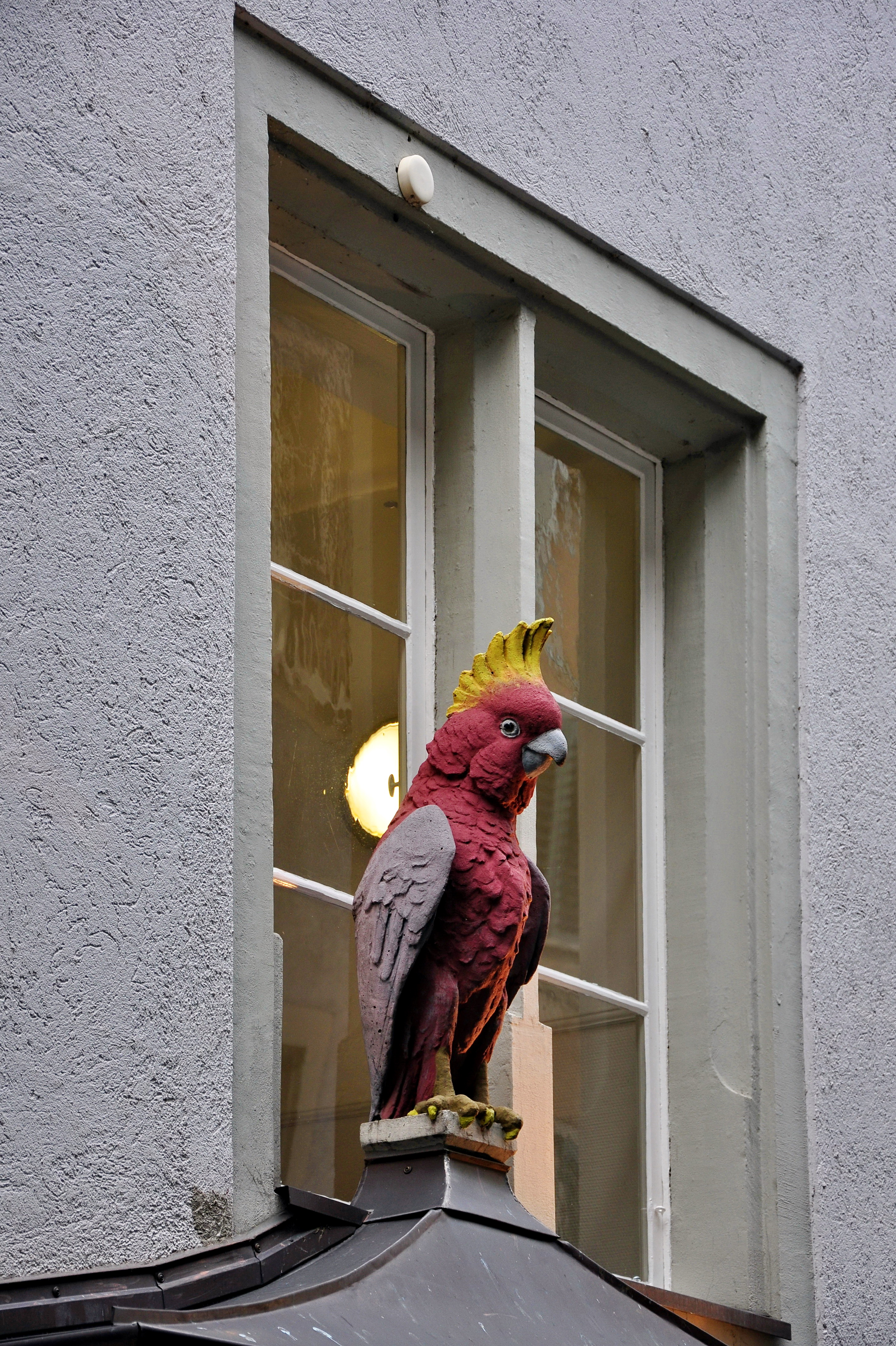
«Haus zum Sitkust», Detail

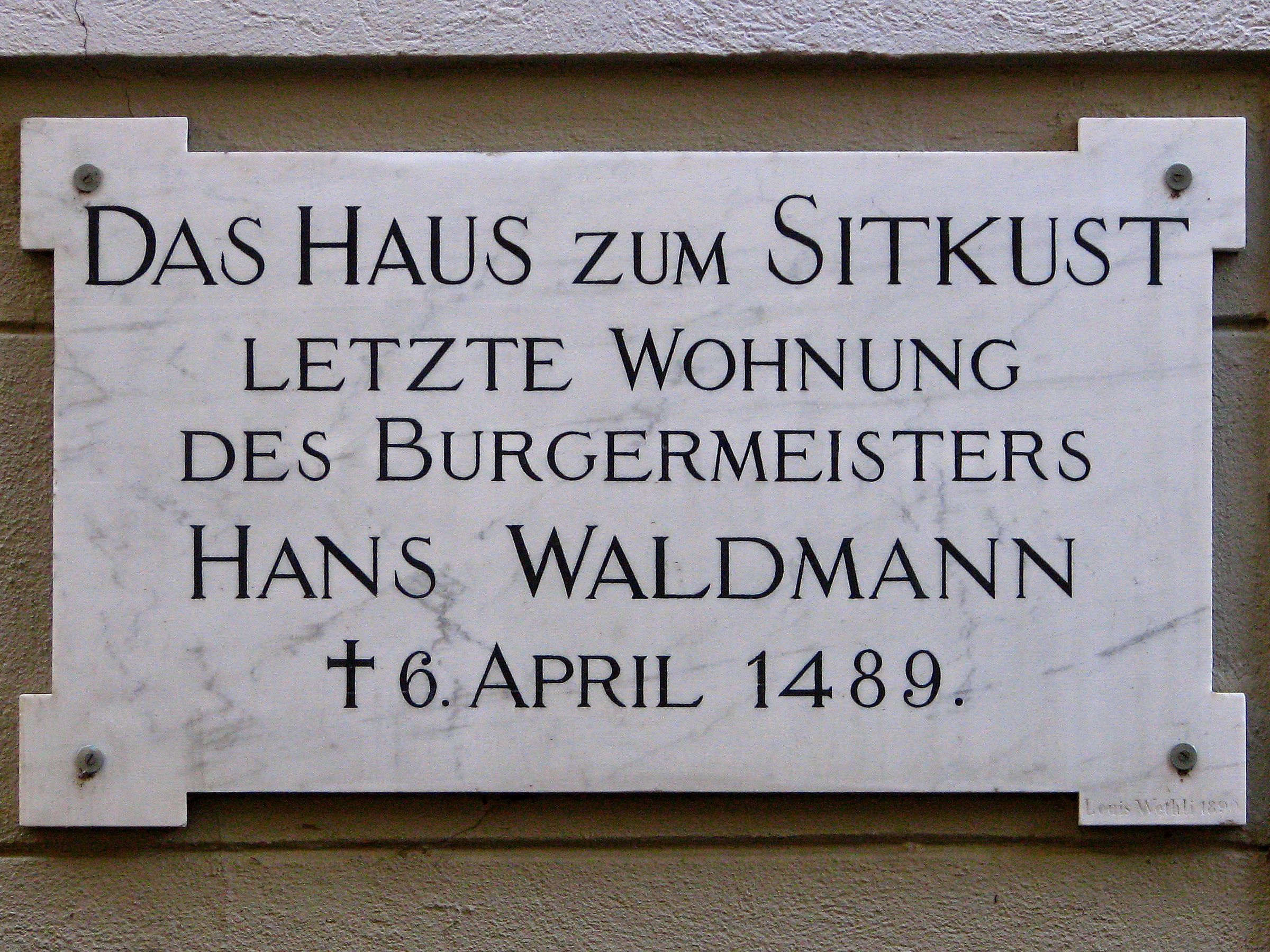
Memorial (Oberdorfstrasse)
