= Zunfthaus zur Saffran =

Building in Zürich, Switzerland

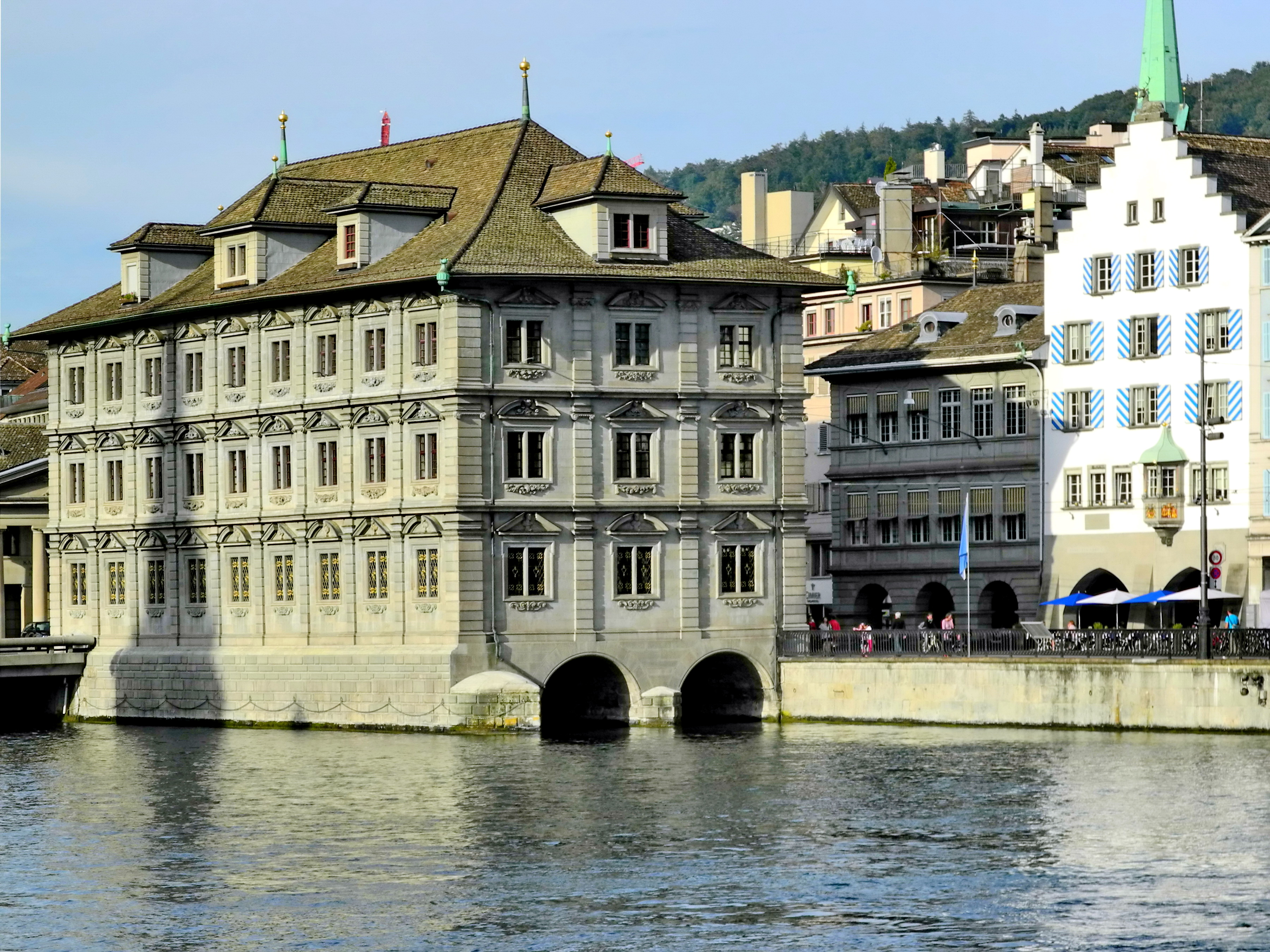
- Rathaus Zürich, Zunfthaus zur Saffran (in the middle, in the shadow of the Rathaus) and Zunfthaus zur Haue, as seen from nearby Wühre

- Location within Switzerland
- 47°22′17″N 8°32′35″E
- Type: guild house
- Location: Zürich, Switzerland

History
- Built: 1732, renewed 1995

Site notes
- Elevation: 408 m (1,339 ft)
- Area: Limmatquai
- Architectural style: Baroque
- Governing body: Zunft zur Saffran
- Website: http://www.saffran.ch

Zunfthaus Zur Saffran (the guild house of the spice traders; Saffran means saffron) is a historically significant building in Zürich, Switzerland. It is located along the Limmatquai promenade between Münsterbrücke and Rathausbrücke. It is close to the Kämbel, Zimmerleuten and Rüden guild houses. The building is listed in the Swiss inventory of cultural property of national and regional significance as a major object of regional importance.

== History ==
The guild house's earliest recorded history dates back to 1383, when 18 individuals bought a building on the land where it now stands. Five buildings preceded the current building. Construction began on the current building between 1719 and 1723. The historical American Van Leer family traces their roots to ancestors who were members of the Saffran guild.

The current building is situated on the Limmat River's right bank in the immediate neighborhood of the Grossmünster church, the Rathaus, Zürich, and the Haus Zum Rüden. The building exhibits typical architectural features from its era such as its facade, which includes cornices and columns. In the mid-19th-century, the building was also used as an improvised post office.

The latest renovation was completed in 1995. The big guild hall on the first floor, the small guild hall, and the White Rose hall on the second floor are available for visiting. The guild house is referenced in the book Das Zürcher Zunftwesen by Markus Brühlmeier and Beat Frei.

Currently, as of January 11, 2016, the building serves as a dinner hall and is open Sunday through Saturday from 7 A.M. to 12 P.M. local time.

== Details ==
- Maximum capacity: 250
- Distance to Zürich main station: 700 m
- Travel time from Zürich main station (public transport): 8 minutes
- Travel time from Zürich Airport (public transport): 25 minutes
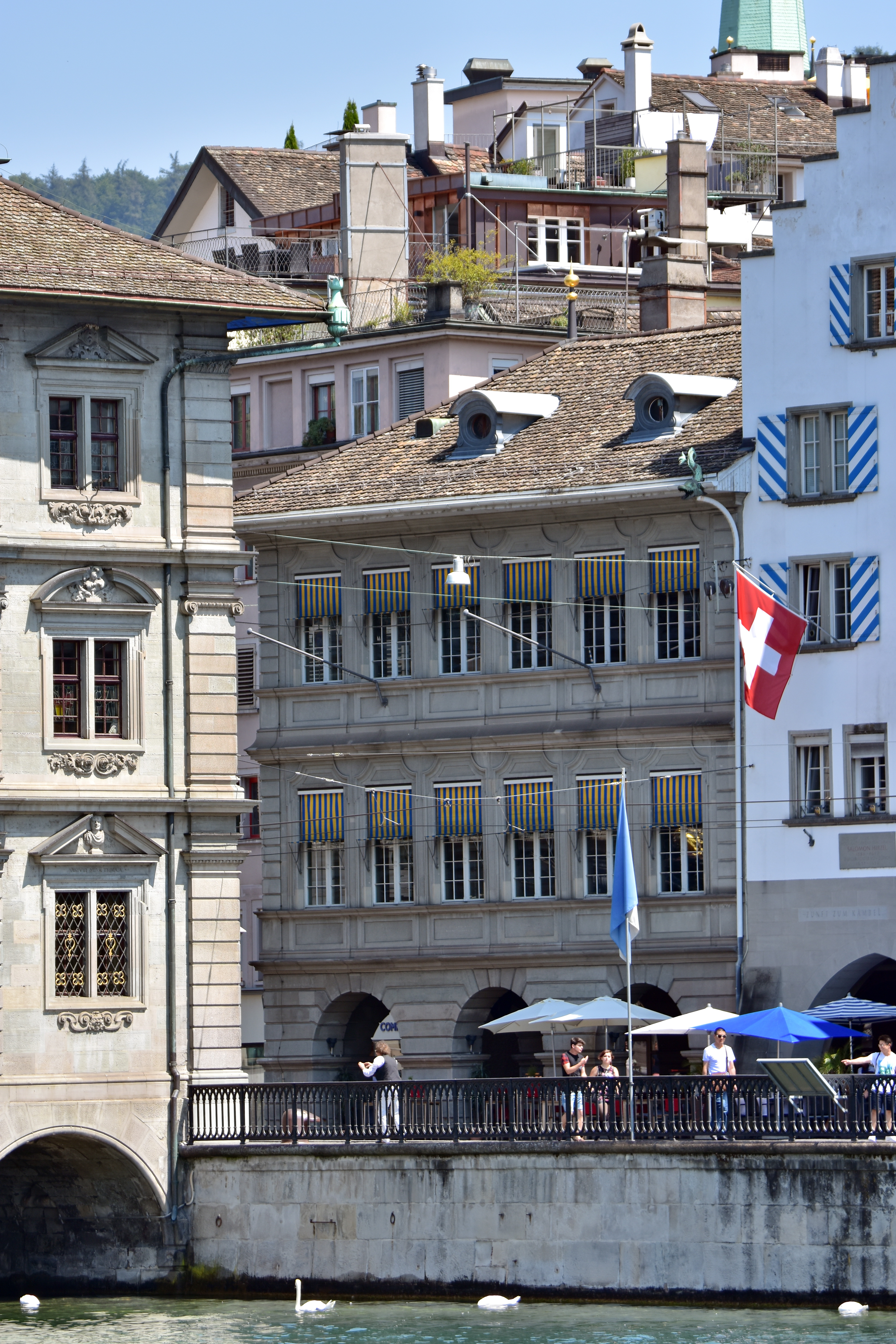
As seen from Wühre towards Limmatquai

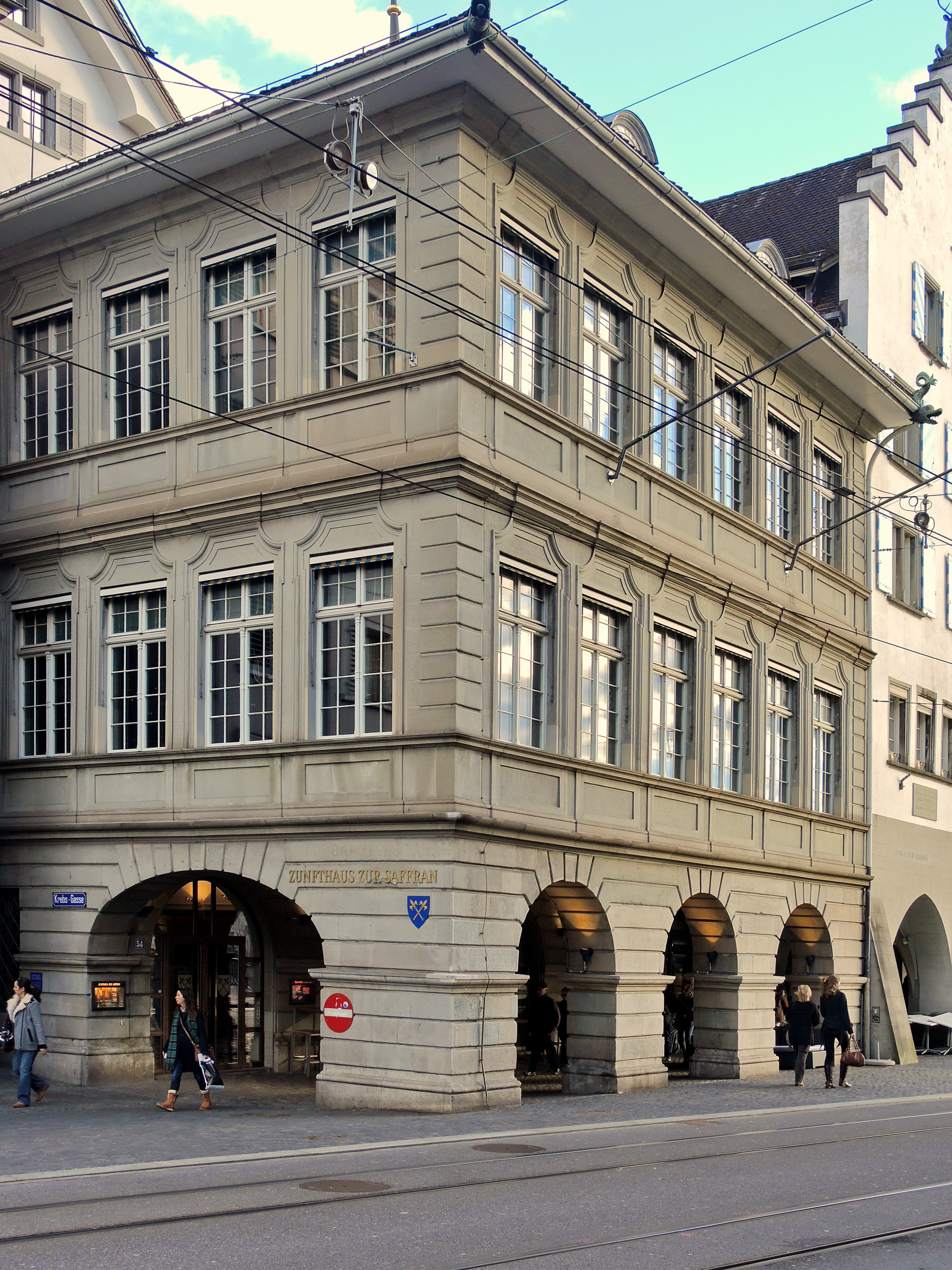
As seen from Gmüesbrugg

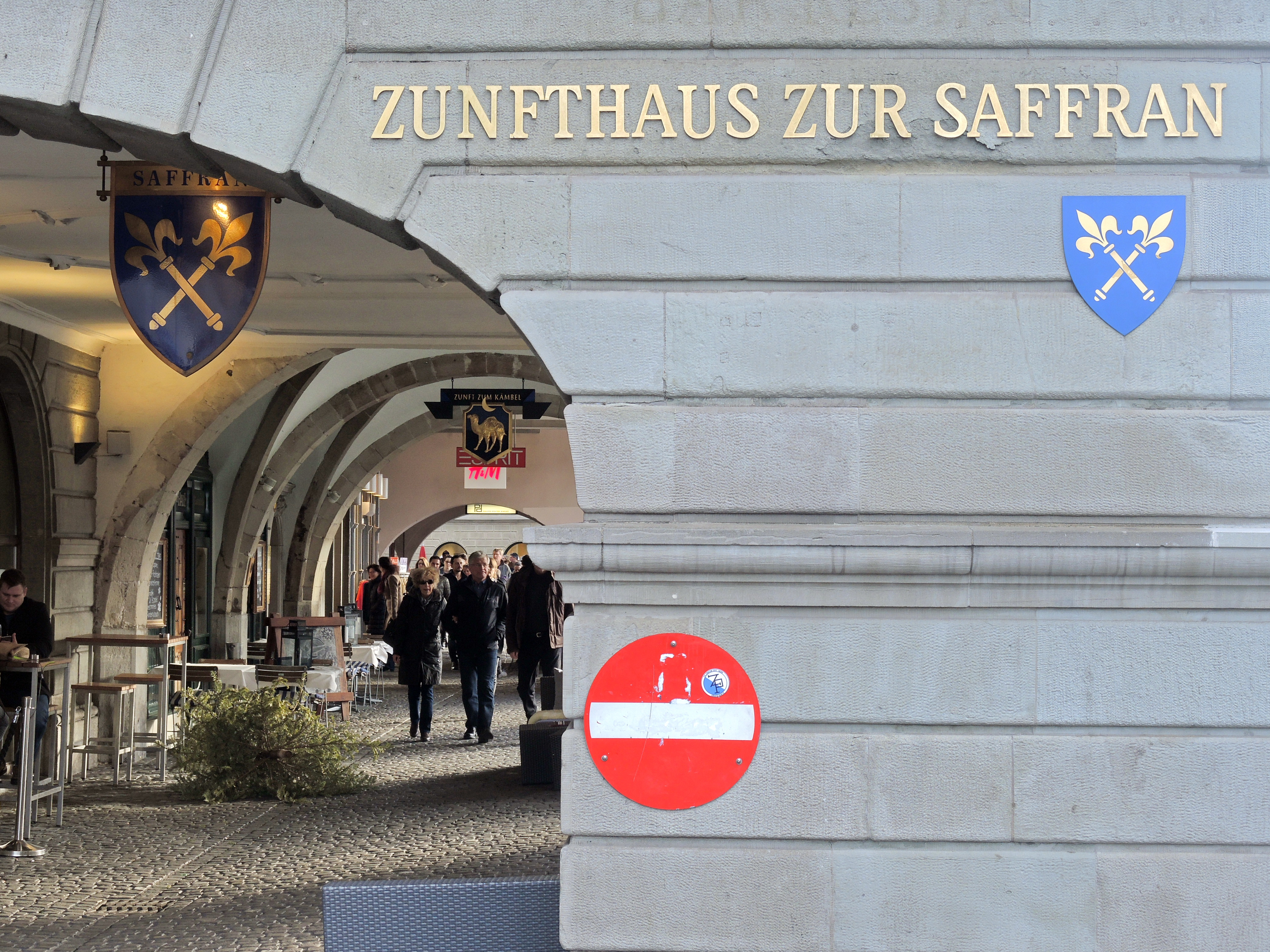
Passageway

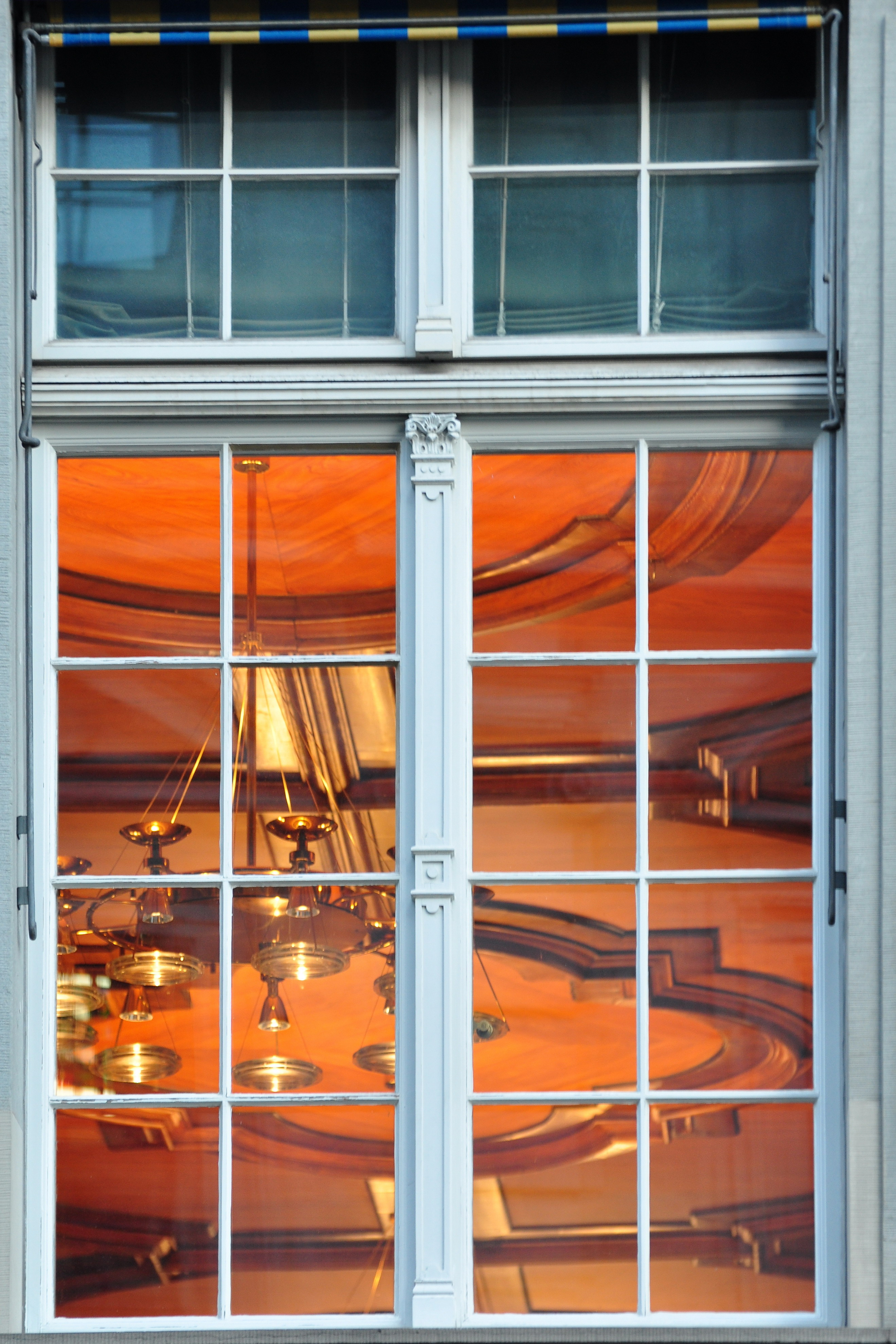
Room view

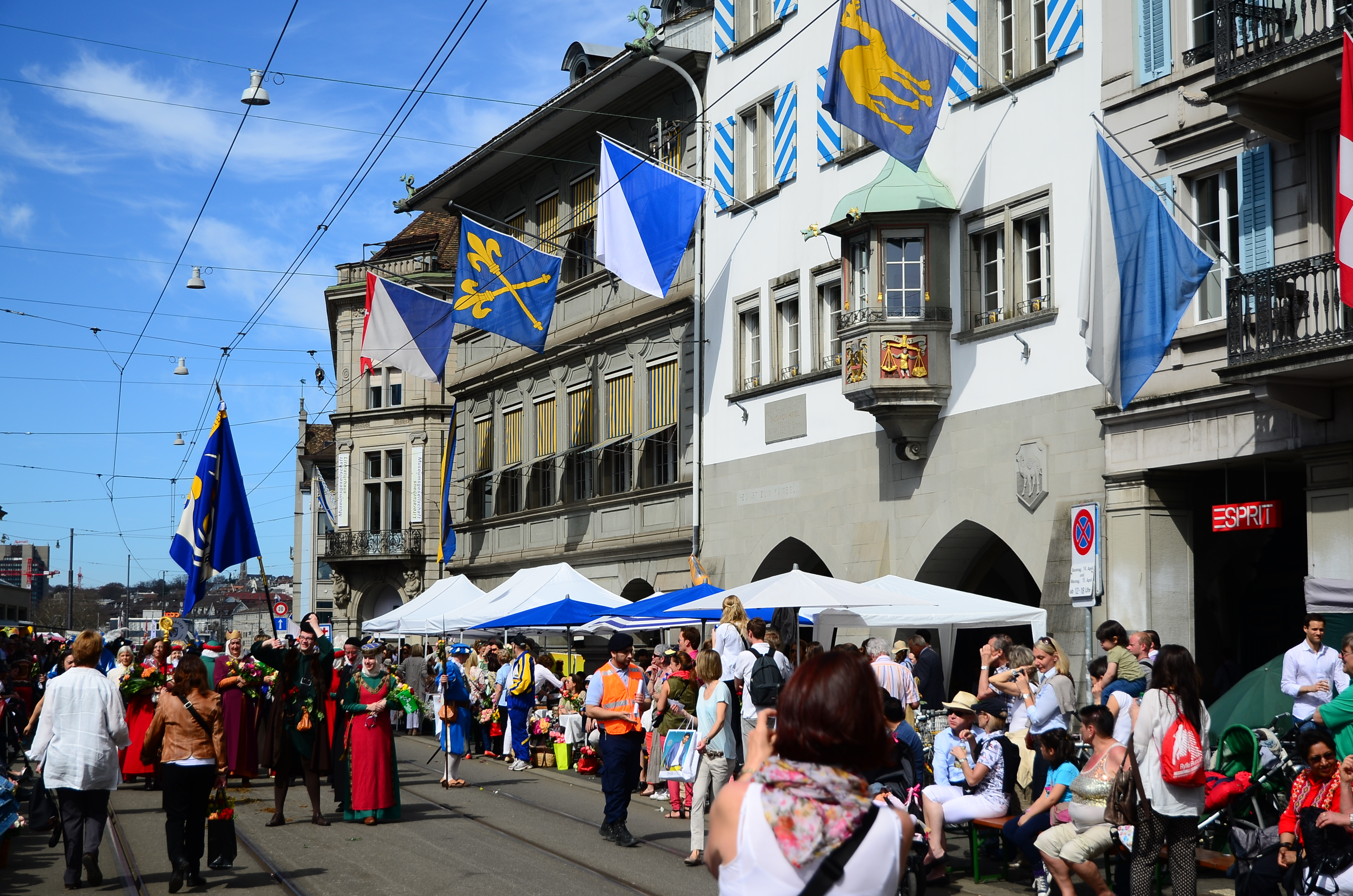
Zunfthaus zur Saffran and Zunfthaus zur Haue as seen from Limmatquai
