= Zunfthaus zur Meisen =

Guild house in Zurich, Switzerland

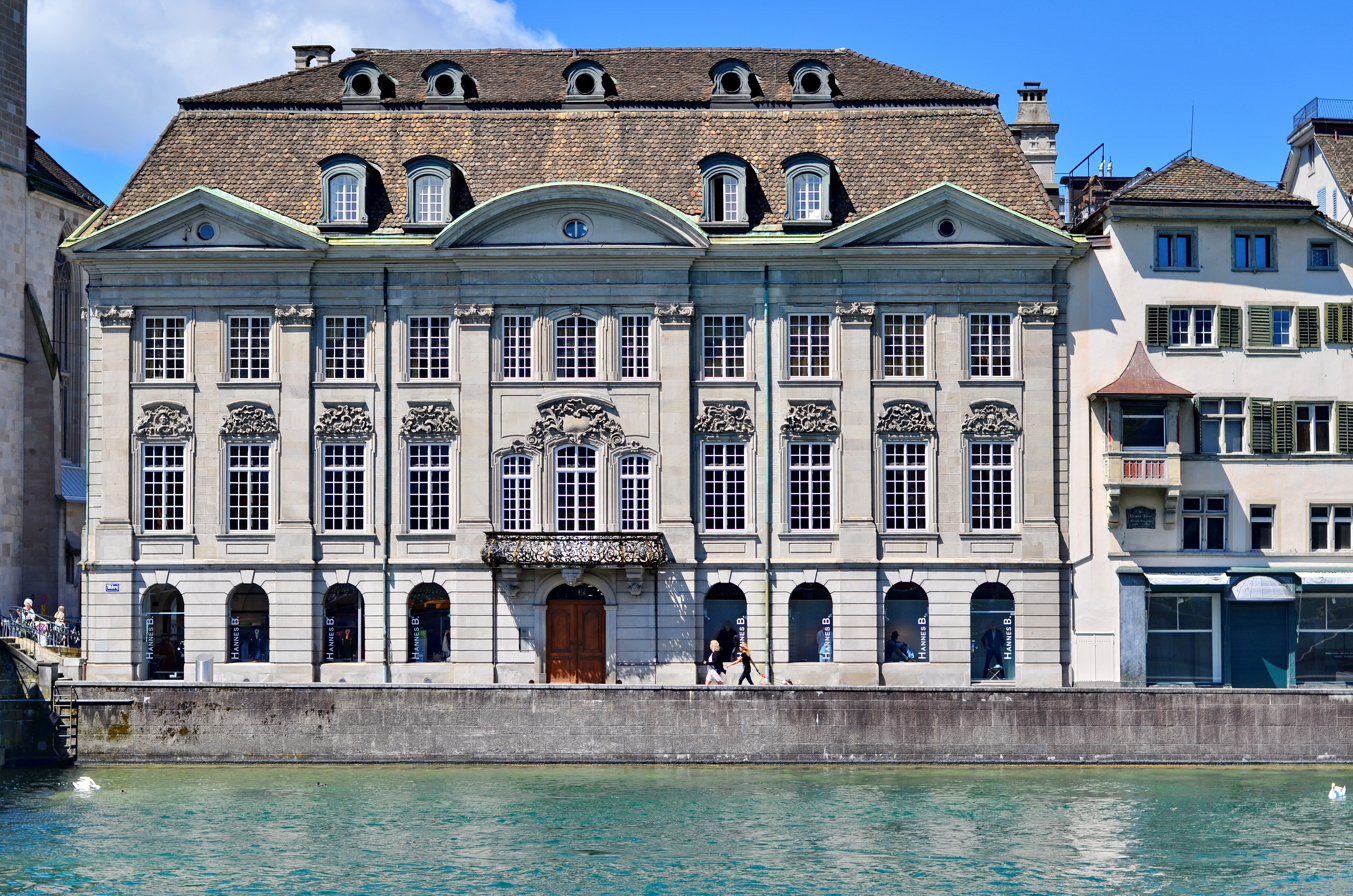
- Eastern facade as seen from Limmatquai
- Established: 1908
- Location: Münsterhof, Zürich
- Coordinates: 47°22′12″N 8°32′39″E
- Architect: David Morf
- Owner: Zunft zur Meisen
- Public transit access: Zürich Tram lines 2, 4 and 15 stop Helmhaus at Limmatquai, or Limmat tour boat towards Storchen
- Website: Official website

The Zunfthaus zur Meisen is the guild house of the Zunft zur Meisen. It is one of the many historically valuable buildings in the Lindenhof quarter in Zürich, Switzerland, and also housed the porcelain and faience collection of the Swiss National Museum by April 2018. It is situated at the Münsterhof and the Münsterbrücke, a bridge over the river Limmat, opposite the upper Limmatquai with the Constaffel, Zimmerleuten, Kämbel and Saffran guild houses.

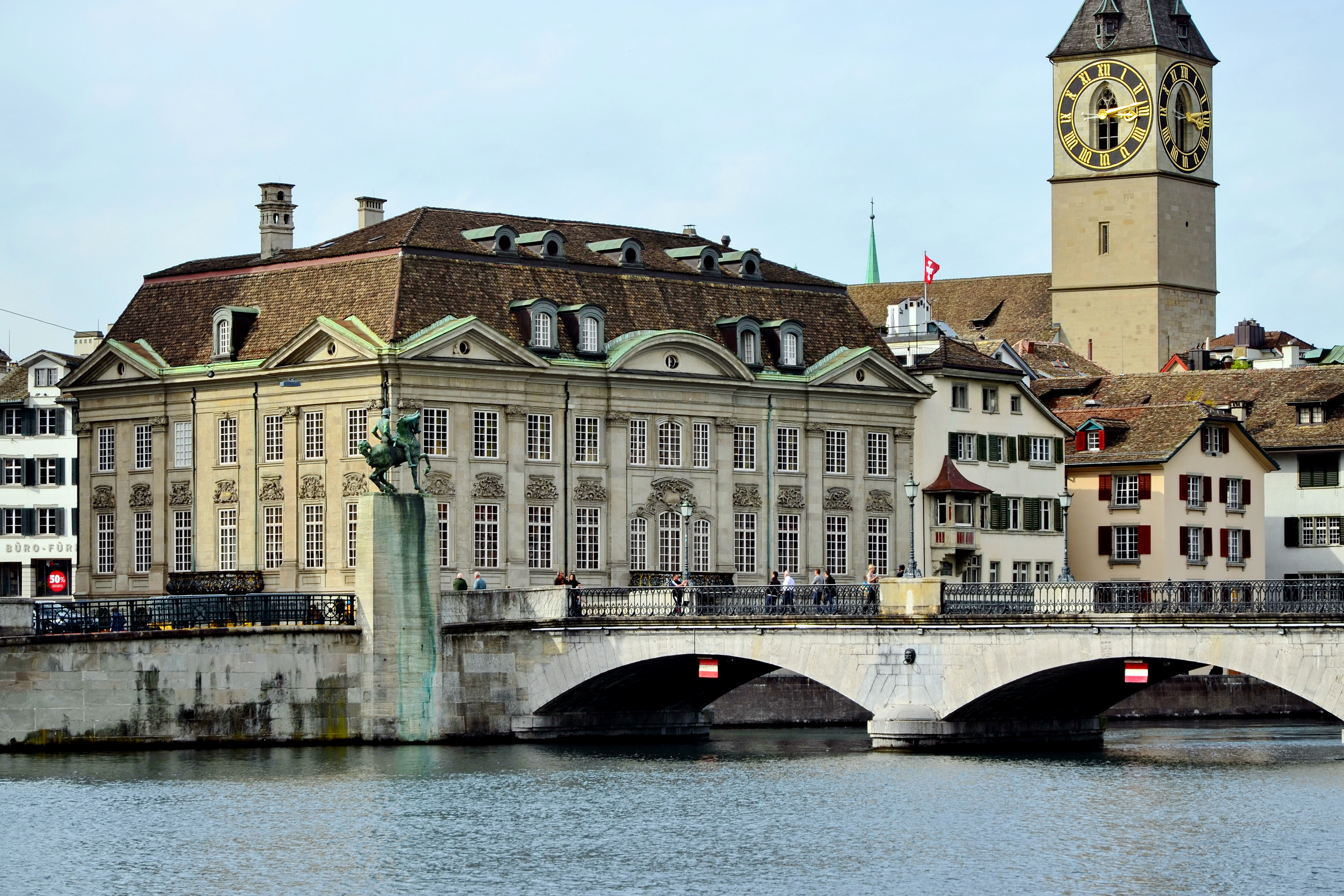
Zunfthaus zur Meisen and Münsterbrücke

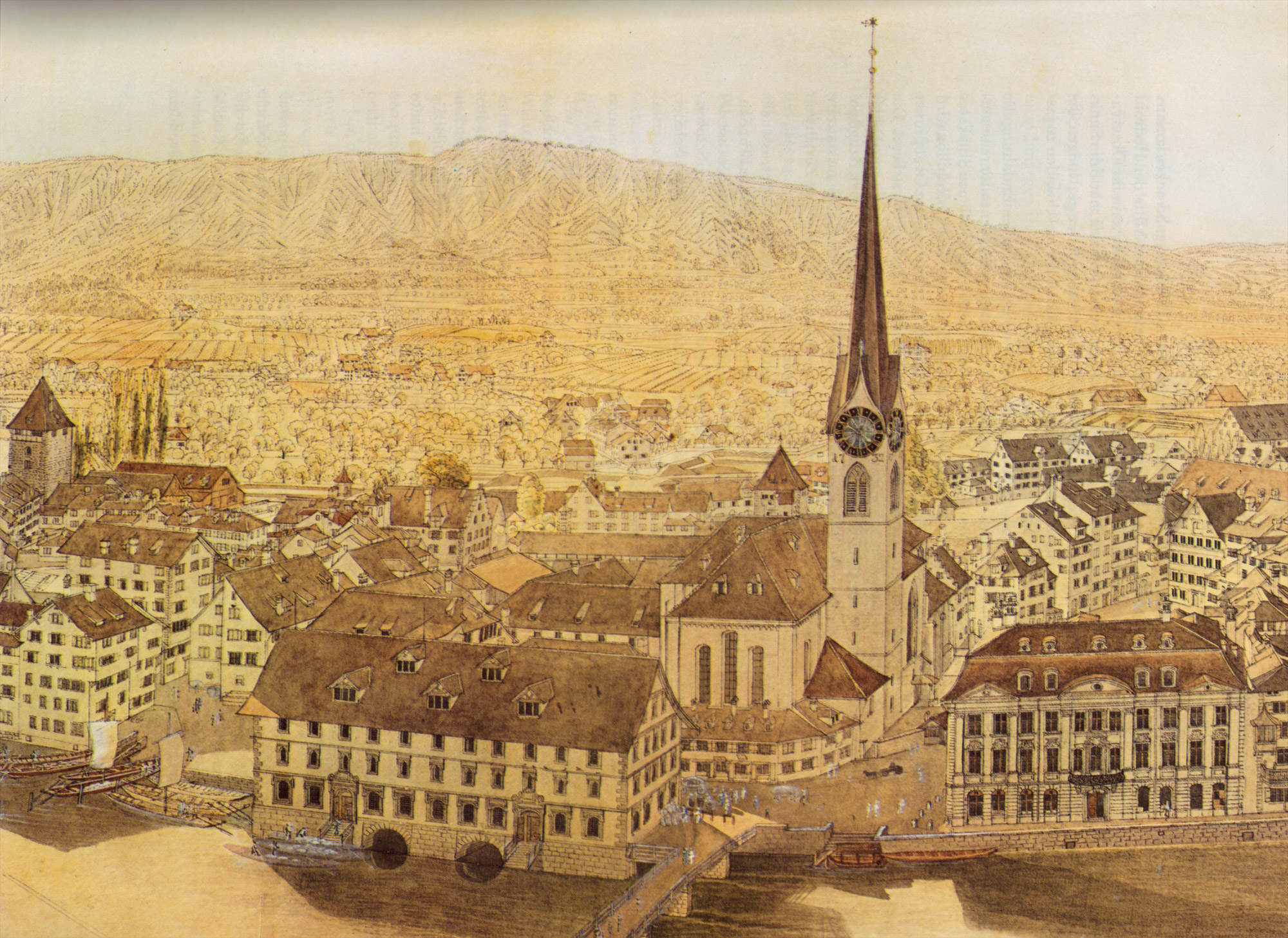
Fraumünster abbey, old Kornhaus (at the left side) and Meisen guild house. Aquarell by Franz Schmid, showing situation in 1757.

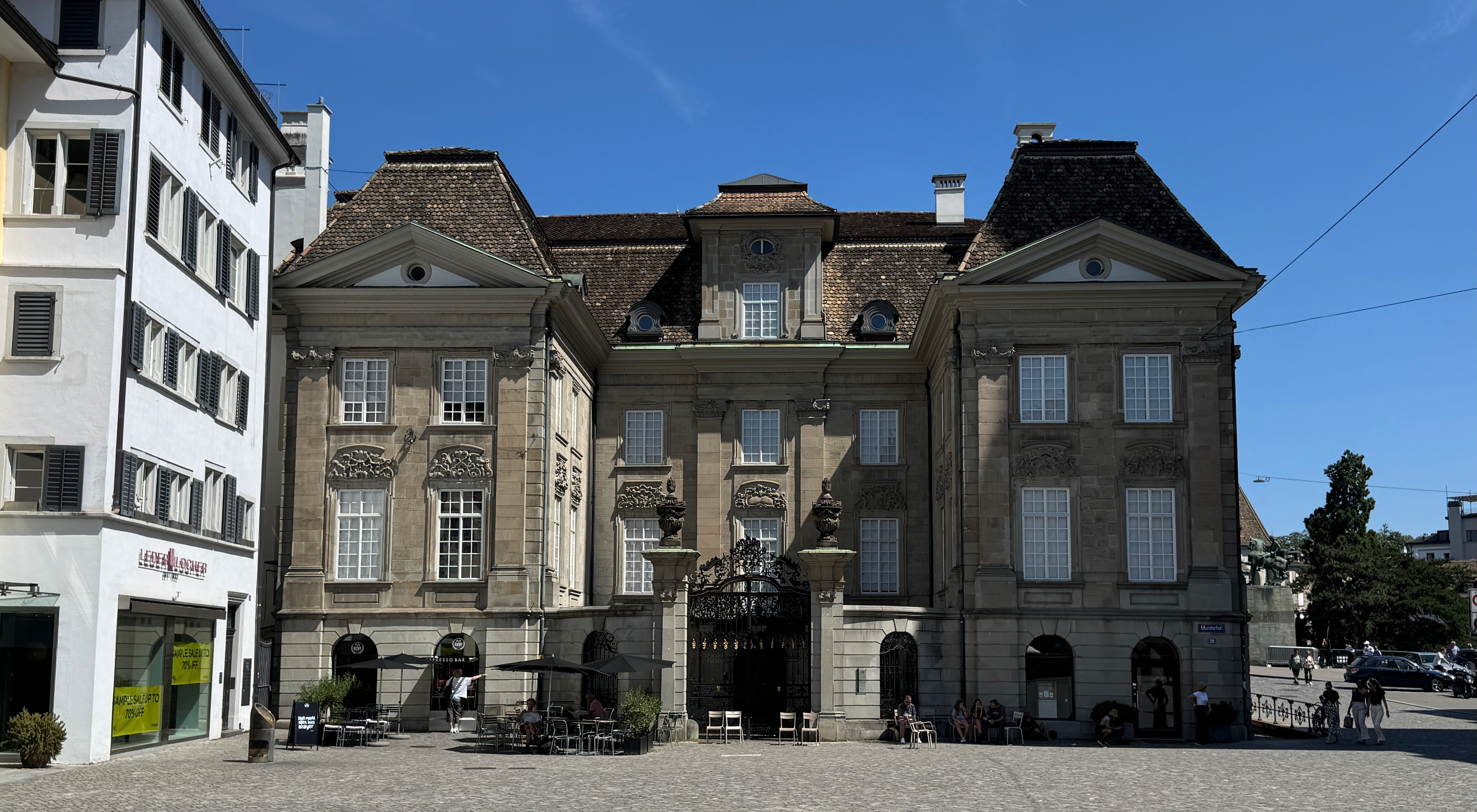
The courtyard as seen from Münsterhof

== History ==
=== The Zunft zur Meisen ===
In 1449, the former Zunft zum Winlütten (innkeepers guild) built a house named der Meysen hus. That same year the guild, which was composed of vintners, tavern owners, saddlers and painters, changed their name to reflect the name of the house, Zunft zur Meisen (Meisen guild).

The Zunft zum Winlütten, along with the other medieval Zürich guilds, was founded in 1336, based on a system established by Rudolf Brun, Zurich's first independent mayor. Although the guilds represented various craft associations, they were also economic, political, social and even military organizations that participated in the wars of the medieval city republic as independent military units. They also constituted the councilors of the elitary council of the medieval city republic of Zürich, until the French revolutionary troops terminated the guild regime, and the Old Swiss Confederacy collapsed in spring 1798.

The Zürich guilds, except for the women members of the Fraumünster society who only participate as guests of the Constaffel, still celebrate Sechseläuten.

=== Building of the Zunft ===
In early times, the "Alter Einsiedlerhof" house stood on the site of today's guild house. This was first mentioned on 25 October 1268. Abbot Anselm von Einsiedeln once had this building built as a flophouse for the abbot. In addition, the house also contained the former apartment of the administrator. In 1618 the former "Alte Einsiedlerhof" was sold to Squire Colonel Kaspar Schmid who had the time-honored house replaced by a new building.

In 1752 construction of a new guild house was begun, and the widows of two stonemasons caused a stir by submitting a lower bid than their male counterparts. The two women were given the contract. The building is located on the Limmat river's left shore, in immediate neighborhood of the Fraumünster abbey at the Münsterhof plaza.

The building originally housed an observatory, the Urania Sternwarte, on its roof. In 1759, the astronomical commission used this telescope to define the Culminatio solis, thus determining the exact location of the city of Zürich on the globe. In the 19th century, Gottfried Keller and Ferdinand Hodler were among the most famous guests of the former Café zur Meisen. In the 20th century, Gustaf V of Sweden, Winston Churchill, Elizabeth II of the United Kingdom and Jimmy Carter were all visitors. The building is still a restaurant of the higher price class.

== Architecture ==
The former Zunft zum Winlütten had its guild house at Marktgasse. In 1757, a Rococo palace in the French style – with a cour d'honneur and elegant puddling doors – was built by the architect, David Morf (1700–1773). The stone for the building was Bollinger sandstone from the quarries on Obersee lake shore. Particular attention was given to the interior of the building; the ceiling and wall paintings are by Johann Balthasar Bullinger, the masonry heaters by Leonhard Locher and Hans Jakob Hofmann, and the elaborate stucco ceilings by the Tyrolean master Johann Schuler. The two guild rooms and the balcony hall between them are decorated with lavish stucco and form an ideal backdrop for the comprehensive presentation of Baroque table culture. With this connection, the house and exhibition merge into a synthesis of the arts. The Zunfthaus zur Meisen is considered one of the most beautiful guild houses in Zürich.

== Porcelain and Faience collections ==
From 1958 to 17 April 2018 the guild house was one of the seven sites of the Swiss National Museum and housed its porcelain and faience collection. The permanent exhibition gave an overview of the Swiss porcelain and faience factories of the 18th century, and the development of forms and patterns of dishware and miniatures. One of the focuses were the products of the Porzellanmanufaktur Schooren (1763–1790) in Kilchberg. Changing exhibitions further explained the history and the work of well-known porcelain manufacturers and other cultural and historical issues in Zürich, such as the anniversary exhibition Frauen, Zunft und Männerwelt – 250 Jahre Zunfthaus zur Meisen (Women, Men's Guild and the world - 250 years Guild house Meisen). The main item in the collection was an originally 300-piece dinner service, which Zürich donated to the Einsiedeln Abbey in 1775 as a thank-you for its mediation in the conflict over fishing rights with the Canton of Schwyz. Zürich porcelain is complemented by outstanding objects from Nyon, the other important Swiss porcelain manufactory of that time, which produced from 1781 to 1813. In the field of faience tableware production all Swiss production sites of that time were represented. Zürich's magnificent tiled stoves made of faience refer to the close ties to this branch of industry, but also to the important Swiss harbor tradition.

Because of the less visitor-friendly opening hours (Thursdays to Sundays, from 11 a.m. to 4 p.m.) the museum management tried to reconcile the different needs. Since the opening of the intensively used new Nationalmuseum building, the flow of visitors has shifted even more clearly there. In view of the imminent renovation of the tits, which required the exhibition to be cleared from 17 April 2018 anyway, the management of the National Museum finally decided not to continue the Meisen outstation. It is envisaged that the ceramic and porcelain holdings will one day be integrated into the redesigned permanent exhibition in the west wing of the Landesmuseum, the opening of which is planned for next year after completion of the comprehensive renovation. The museum management expects that this relocation of the collection to the head office will benefit from the link to other collections and that it will be noticed by many more visitors.

== Cultural heritage of national importance ==
The Meisen building and its collection is listed in the Swiss inventory of cultural property of national and regional significance as a Class A object of national importance.

== Literature ==
- Markus Brühlmeier, Beat Frei: Das Zürcher Zunftwesen. Verlag Neue Zürcher Zeitung, Zürich 2005. ISBN 3-03823-171-1
