= Münsterbrücke =

Münsterbrücke may refer to:

- Münsterbrücke, Hamelin, a bridge across the river Weser in Hamelin, Germany
- Münsterbrücke, Zürich, a bridge across the river Limmat in Zürich, Switzerland
