= Haus zum Rüden =

Historic building in Zürich, Switzerland

- Rüden
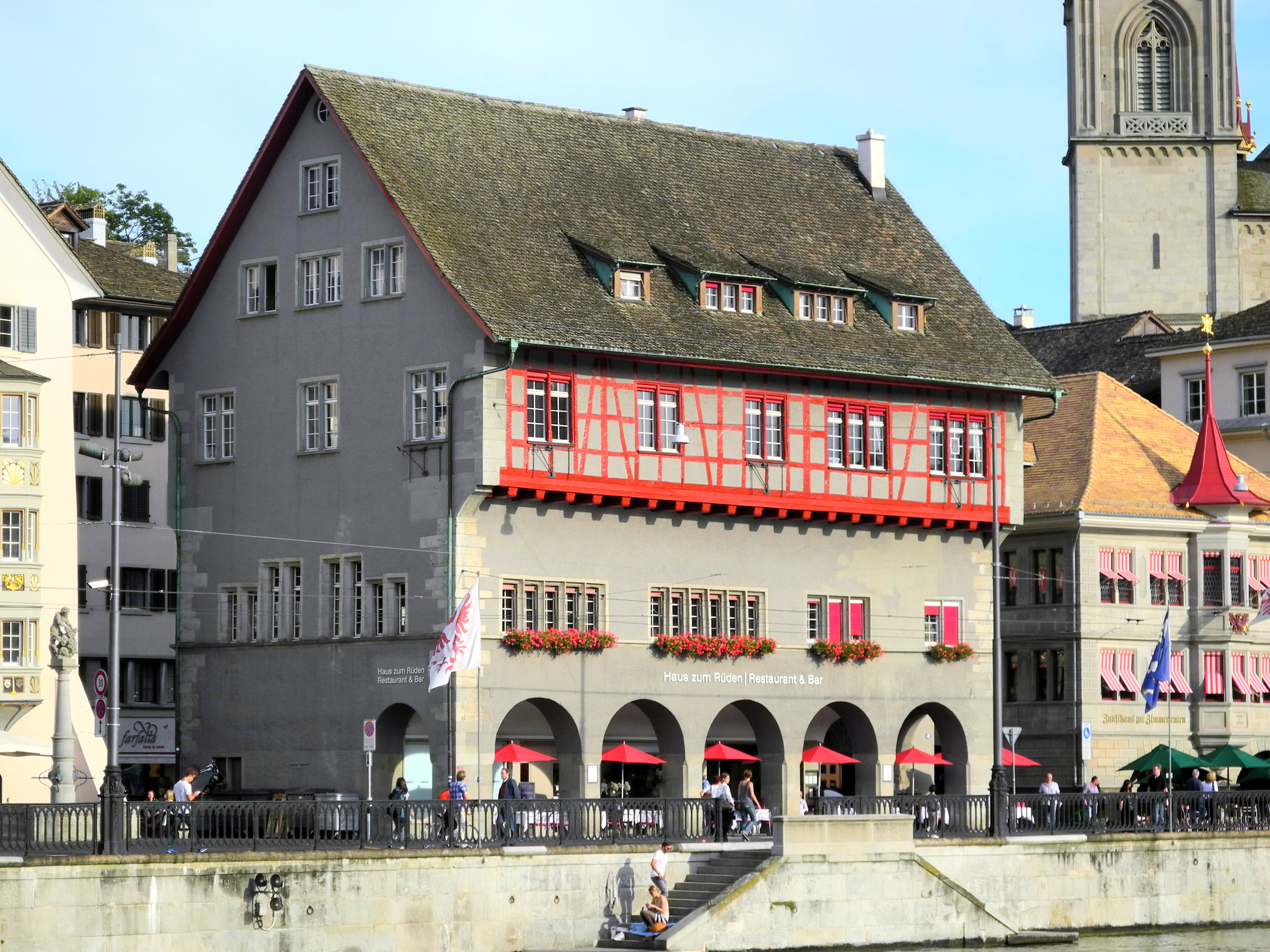
- Rüden and Zunfthaus zur Zimmerleuten at Limmatquai, Grossmünster in the background
- Interactive map of Haus zum Rüden
- 47°22′15″N 8°32′35″E
- Location: Limmatquai Zürich

History
- Built: first mentioned in 1373

Site notes
- Architectural style: European Medieval
- Governing body: Gesellschaft zur Constaffel

The Haus zum Rüden (or for short: Rüden) building is the assembly hall of the Gesellschaft zur Constaffel and one of the historically notable buildings in Zürich, Switzerland. It is situated at the Limmatquai promenade in Zürich, Switzerland, opposite of the Münsterhof plaza respectively the Zunfthaus zur Meisen, and neighboured by the Zimmerleuten, Kämbel and Saffran guild houses.

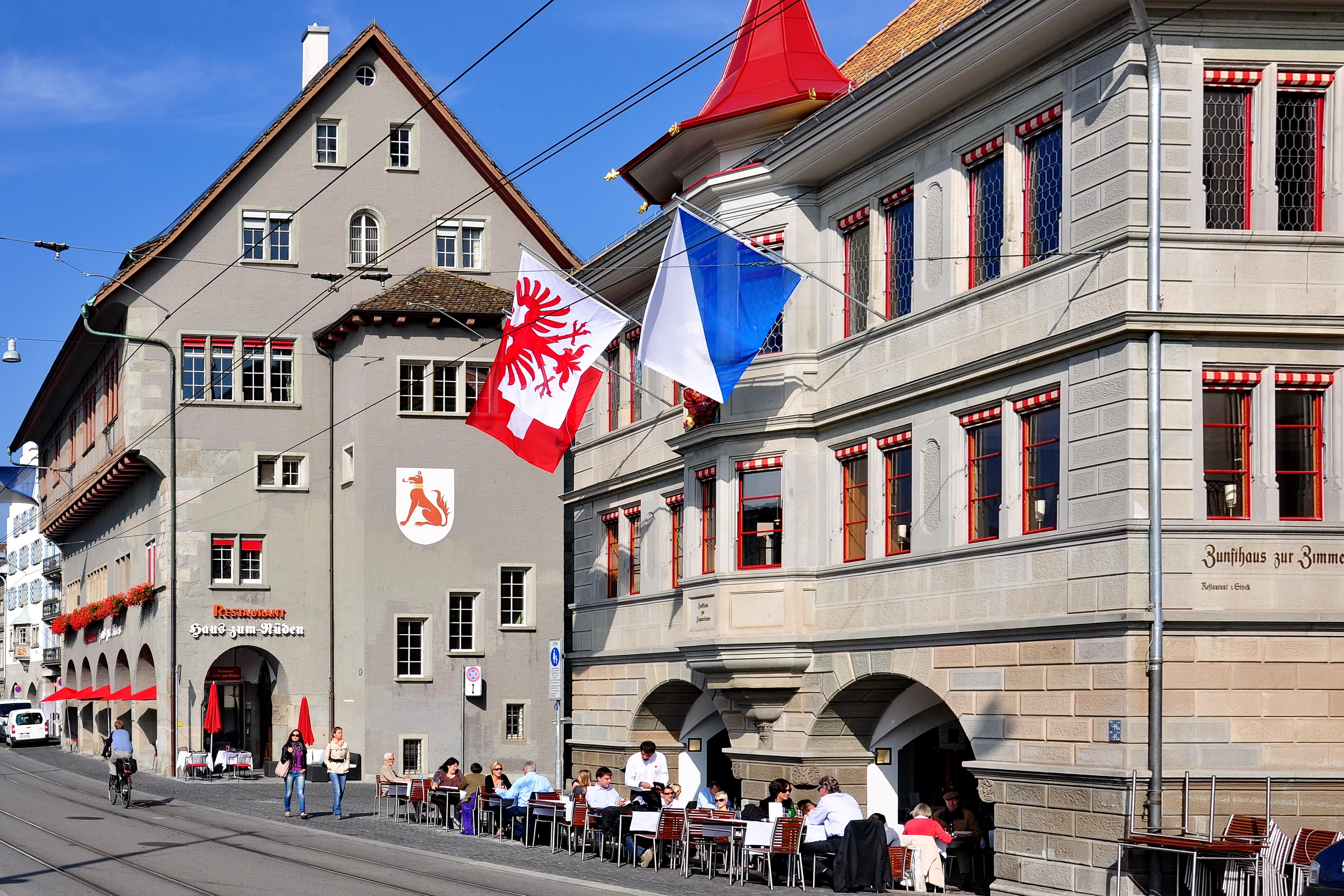
Rüden and Zunfthaus zur Zimmerleuten

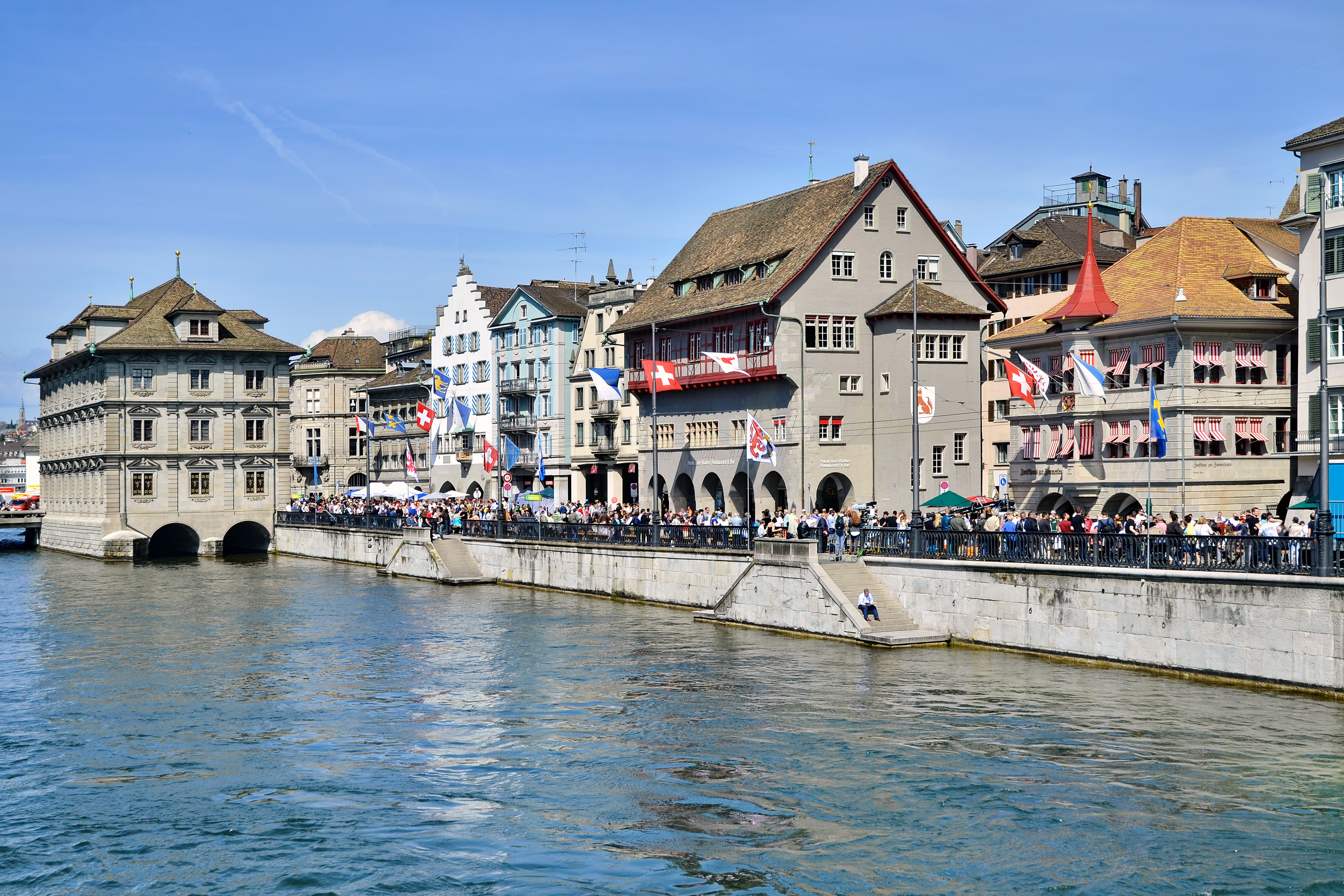
Gmüesbrugg, Rathaus, Saffran, Haue, Rüden and Zimmerleuten buildings at Limmatquai, as seen from Münsterbrücke towards Münsterhof, decorated for Sechseläuten in April 2015.

== Architecture ==
The building was originally a modest timber structure located at the present Limmatquai promenade those section then was named Reichsstrasse. The former mistress of the city, the princess abbess of the Fraumünster abbey, used the building as mint. By order of the city council, the ground floor was rebuilt in 1348 with stone walls and an open porch hall for use as the city hall. In the second floor there was a drinking club used by the members of the Constaffel society.

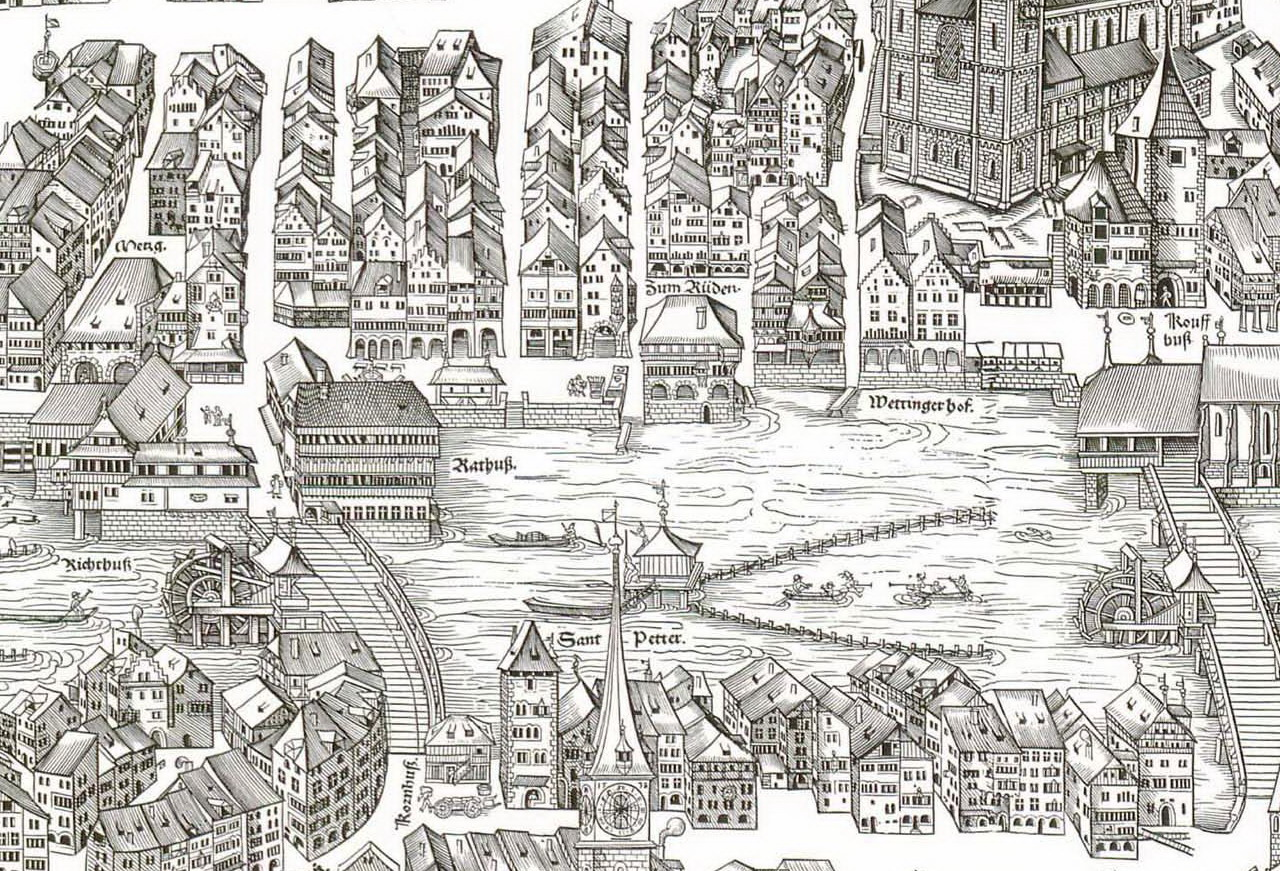
Murerplan, cut

On the Murerplan of 1576, the building can be seen on the right shore of the Limmat, south of the Zunfthaus zur Haue, on the so-called Reichsstrasse (imperial street). Its current form dates from the late 17th century, when it was fitted with an additional timber framing floor that protrudes on two sides over the lower stone walls which are about 1 metre (3 ft) thick. At the request of the city government, a pedestrian walkway was built under the arches for harmony with the appearance of the surrounding buildings. In addition, exterior renovations were made by the Bräm brothers and a redesign of the interior was undertaken by Andre Ammann, to preserve the Gothic style of the original building and to remove subsequent modifications. Impressive features of the Trinkstube – the Gothic hall of the current eponymous restaurant – include the magnificent, 11 metres (36 ft)-wide, curved wooden ceiling beams with carved heads, and the rich interior.

== History ==
=== Building ===
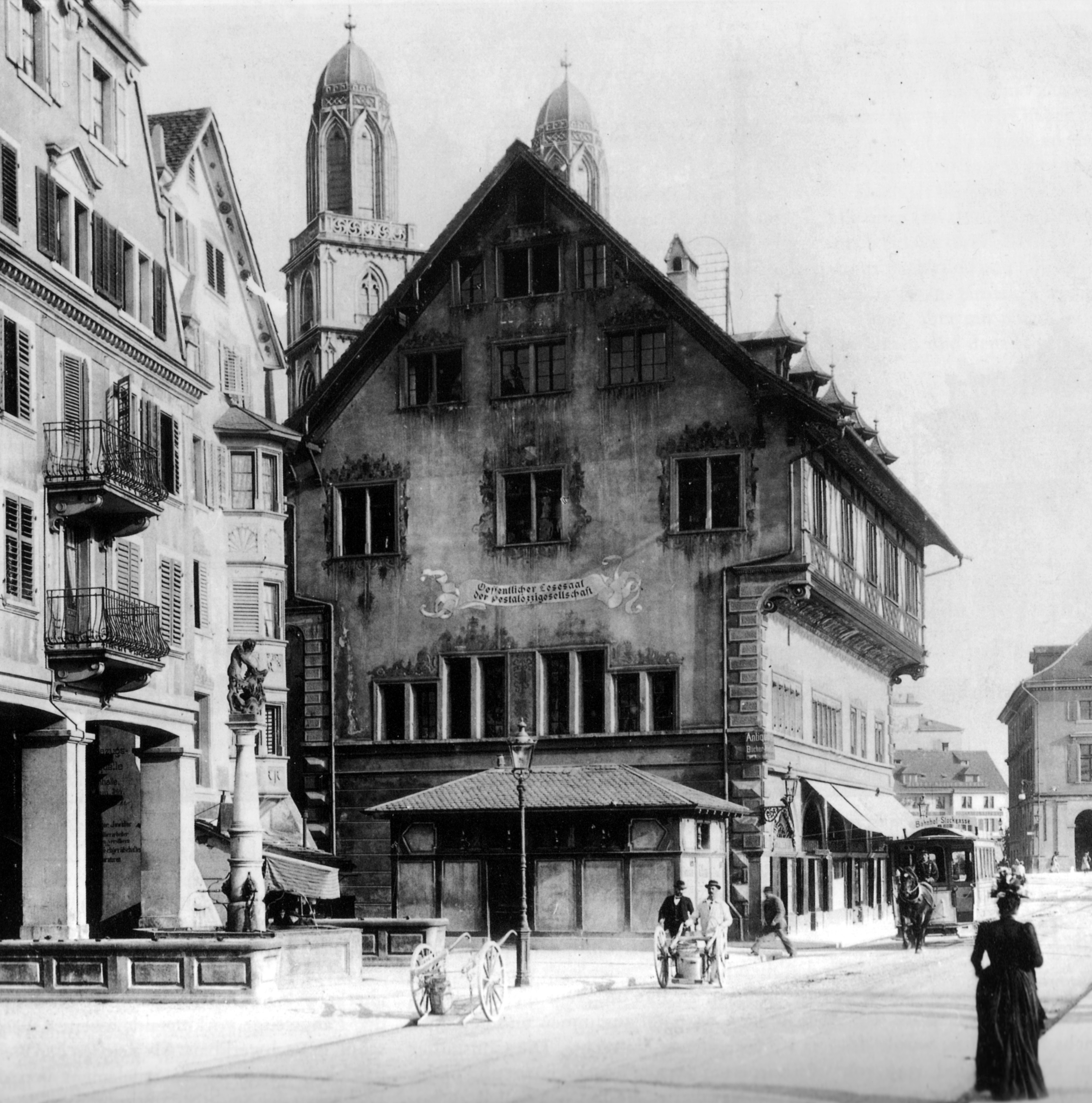
Rüden building in 1898

The Rüden building is first mentioned in 1358 and 1377 in the Fraumünster census. From 1401 when it was sold the Constaffel members, the building was known as the "Trinkstube der Herren zum Rüden". The name "zum Rüden" derives from the wolf hound, which was adopted in the heraldry of the Constaffel as a symbol of aristocratic hunting rights. In 1868 the Rüden building was sold by the then Adelige Gesellschaft (noble society) to the city of Zürich, and in 1937 it was acquired again by the current Gesellschaft zur Constaffel. The building houses also a restaurant of the higher price class.

=== Gesellschaft zur Constaffel ===
The origins of the Constaffel society (German: Gesellschaft zur Constaffel) date back to 1336, when it, along with the medieval Zürich guilds was formally founded on occasion of the Brun guild constitution. Although the guilds were associations of various craft associations, at the same time they were economical, political, social and even military organizations that participated the wars of the medieval city republic in independent military formations; however, the Constaffel members originally comprised the knights respectively minsterality of the Fraumünster abbey and wealthy merchants who usually nominated the mayors of Zürich. They constituted also the councillors of the elitary council of the medieval city republic of Zürich, until the French revolutionary troops terminated the guild regime, and the so-called Old Swiss Confederacy collapsed in spring 1798. As the Zürich guilds, except the women members of the Fraumünster society which participate just as "guests" of the Constaffel, the Constaffel members practice Sechseläuten.

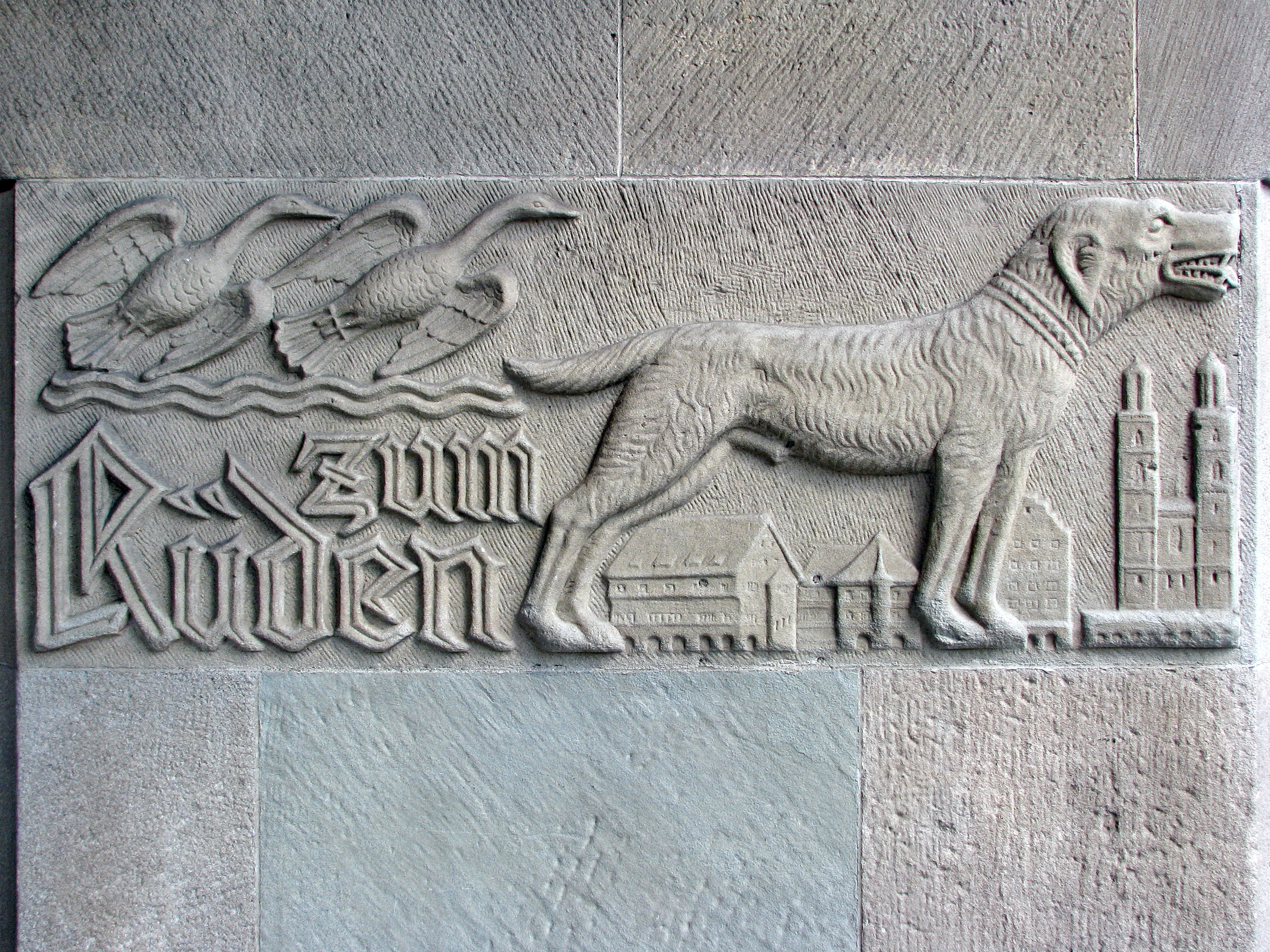
Relief of the wolf hound, symbol of the Rüden guildhall and the Constaffel society's coat of arms

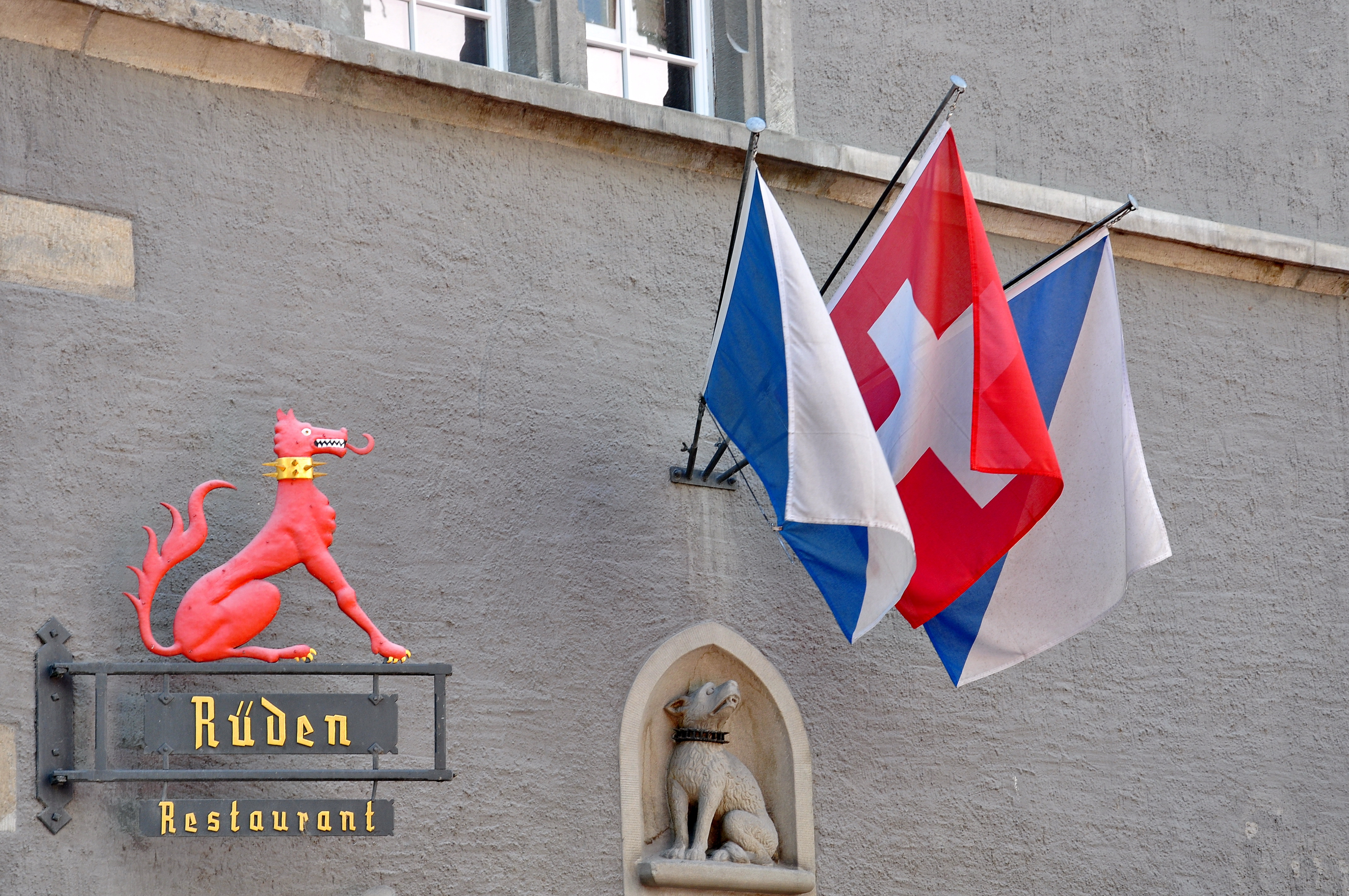

Coats of arms of the Gesellschaft zur Constaffel

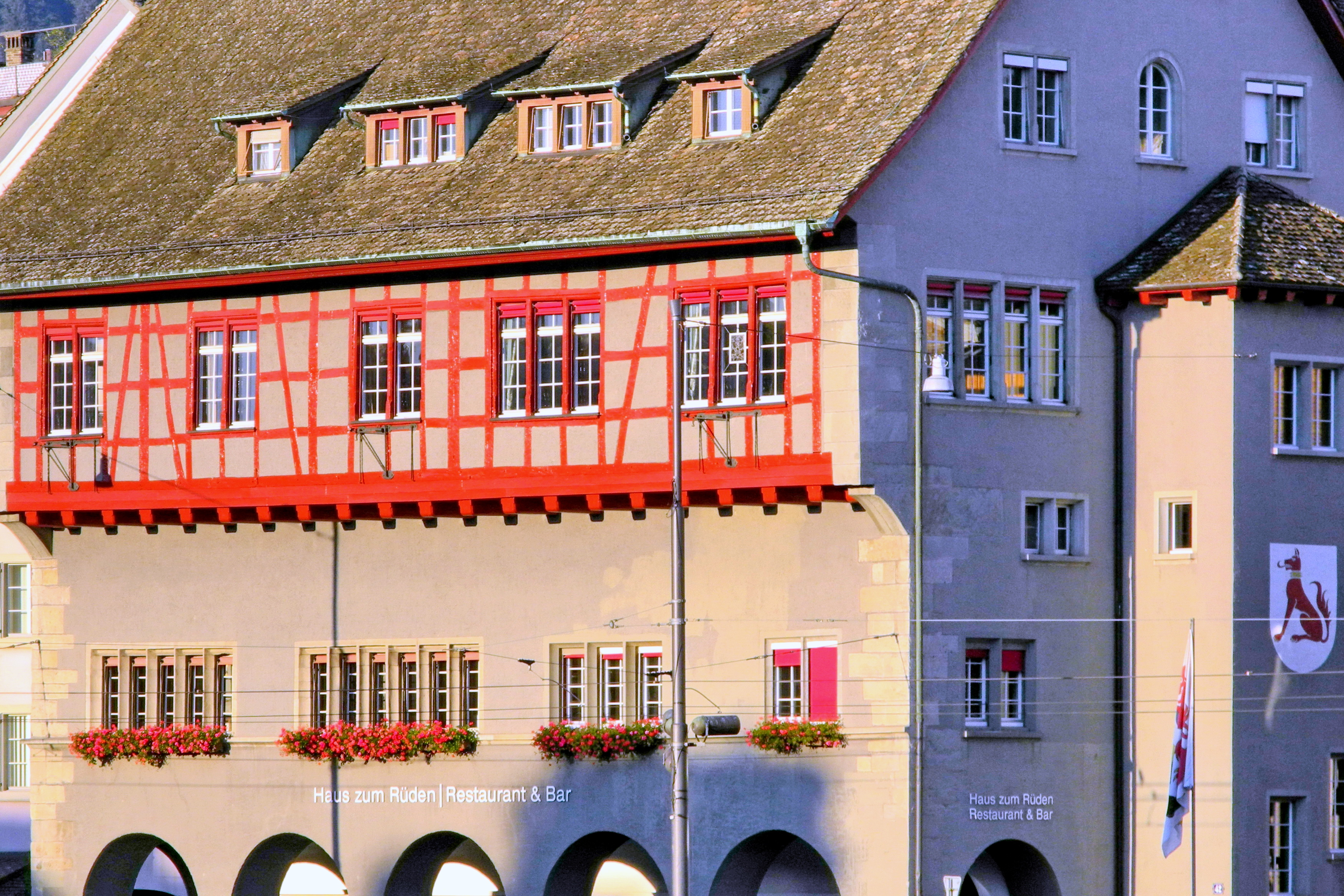
detail view of the timbered first floor

== Cultural heritage of national importance ==
The Rüden building is listed in the Swiss inventory of cultural property of national and regional significance as a Class A object of national importance.

== Literature ==
- Markus Brühlmeier, Beat Frei: Das Zürcher Zunftwesen. NZZ Buchverlag, Zürich 2005. ISBN 3-03823-171-1
