= Wasserkirche =

Church in Zurich, Switzerland

Coordinates: 47°22′10.6″N 8°32′36.0″E

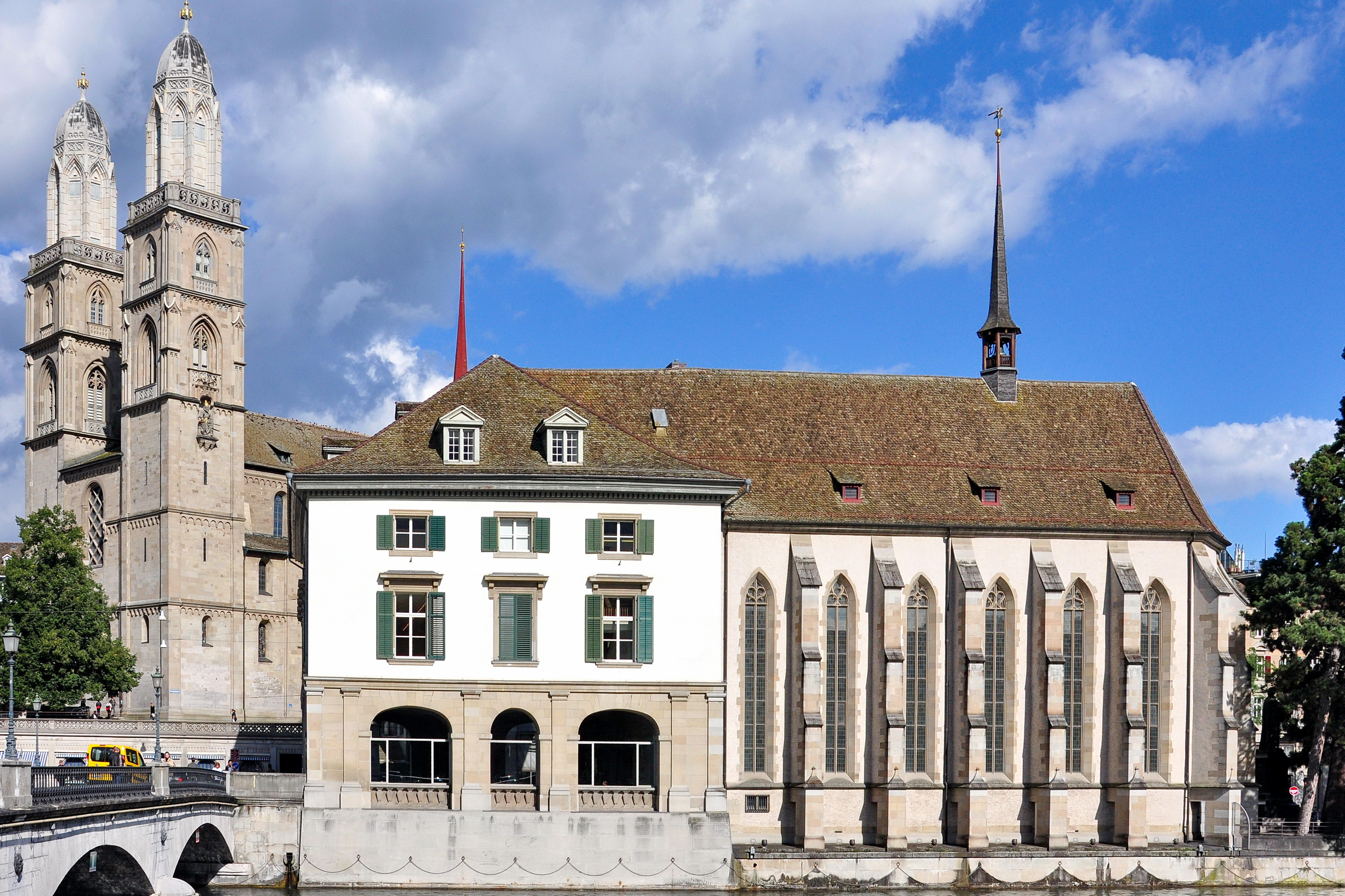
Grossmünster and Wasserkirche with Helmhaus (to the left) as seen from Stadthausquai, Münsterbrücke to the left.

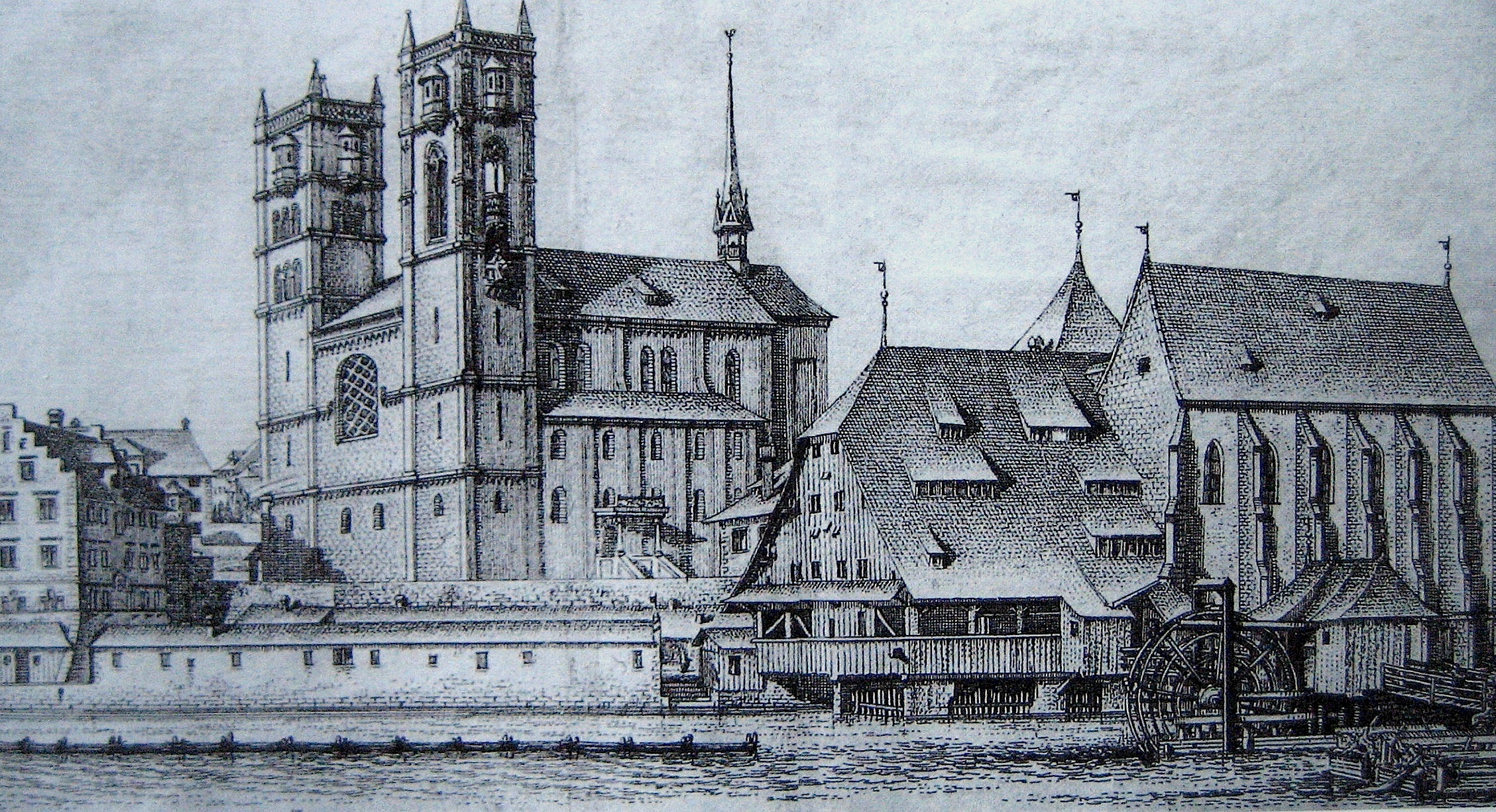
Grossmünster, Helmhaus and Wasserkirche in Zürich (1770)

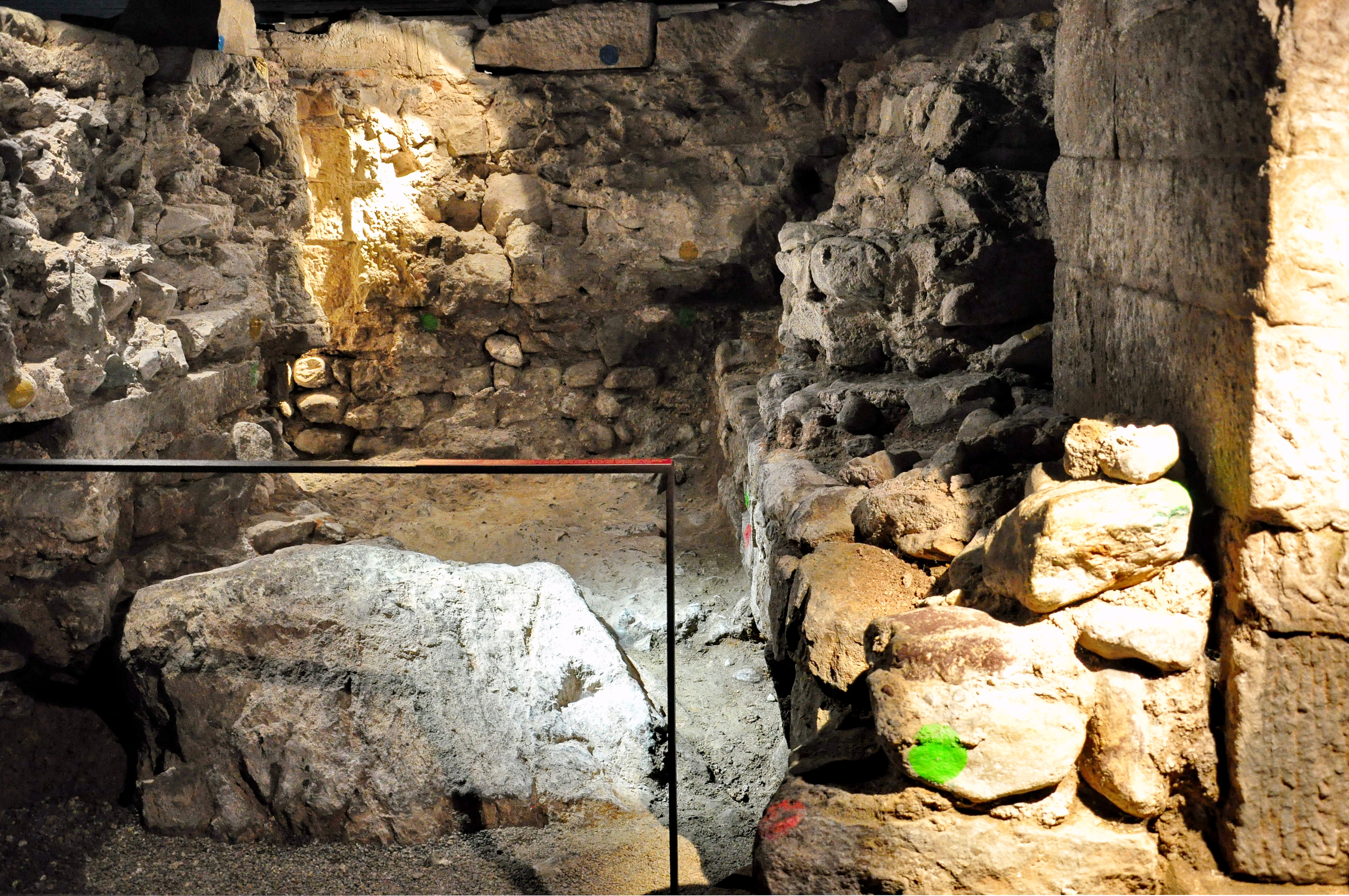
Crypt with so called 'Martyr stone' (Felix and Regula)

The Wasserkirche (lit. 'water church') in Zurich, first mentioned as ecclesia Aquatica Turicensi (in the ablative) around 1250 and as wazzirkilcha in 1256, is a church built on a small island in the river Limmat, situated between the two main churches of medieval Zürich, the Grossmünster and the Fraumünster, at the Limmatquai and the Münsterbrücke. It is joined with the Helmhaus.

== Overview ==
It seems likely that the original building was used for cult meetings. The meetings were centred on a stone now located in the crypt of the church. According to medieval tradition, the site was used for the execution of Saints Felix and Regula. The church was built in the 10th century and modified at various points, culminating in a complete reconstruction that was completed in 1486. During the course of the Reformation, the Wasserkirche was identified as a place of idolatry. Eventually it was secularised, becoming the first public library of Zürich in 1634, when it became a seat of learning that greatly contributed to the foundation of University of Zürich in the 19th century. The island was connected with the right bank of the Limmat in 1839 with the construction of the Limmatquai. The library was merged into the Zentralbibliothek in 1917, and the church was used as a storage room for crops for some time, until reconstruction work and archaeological excavations were undertaken in 1940. Following this the building was again used for services by the Evangelical-Reformed State Church of the Canton of Zürich.

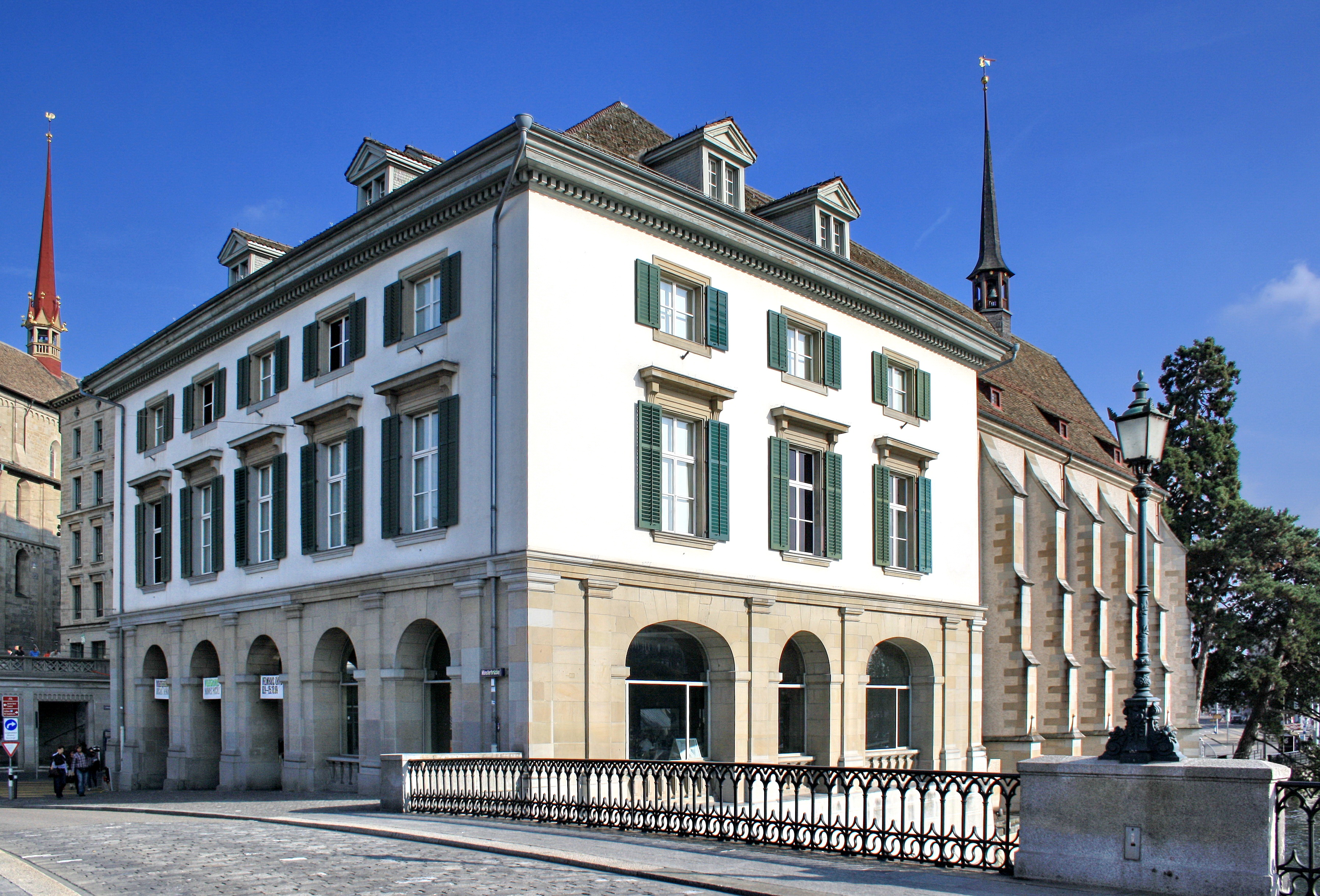
Helmhaus as seen from Münsterbrücke

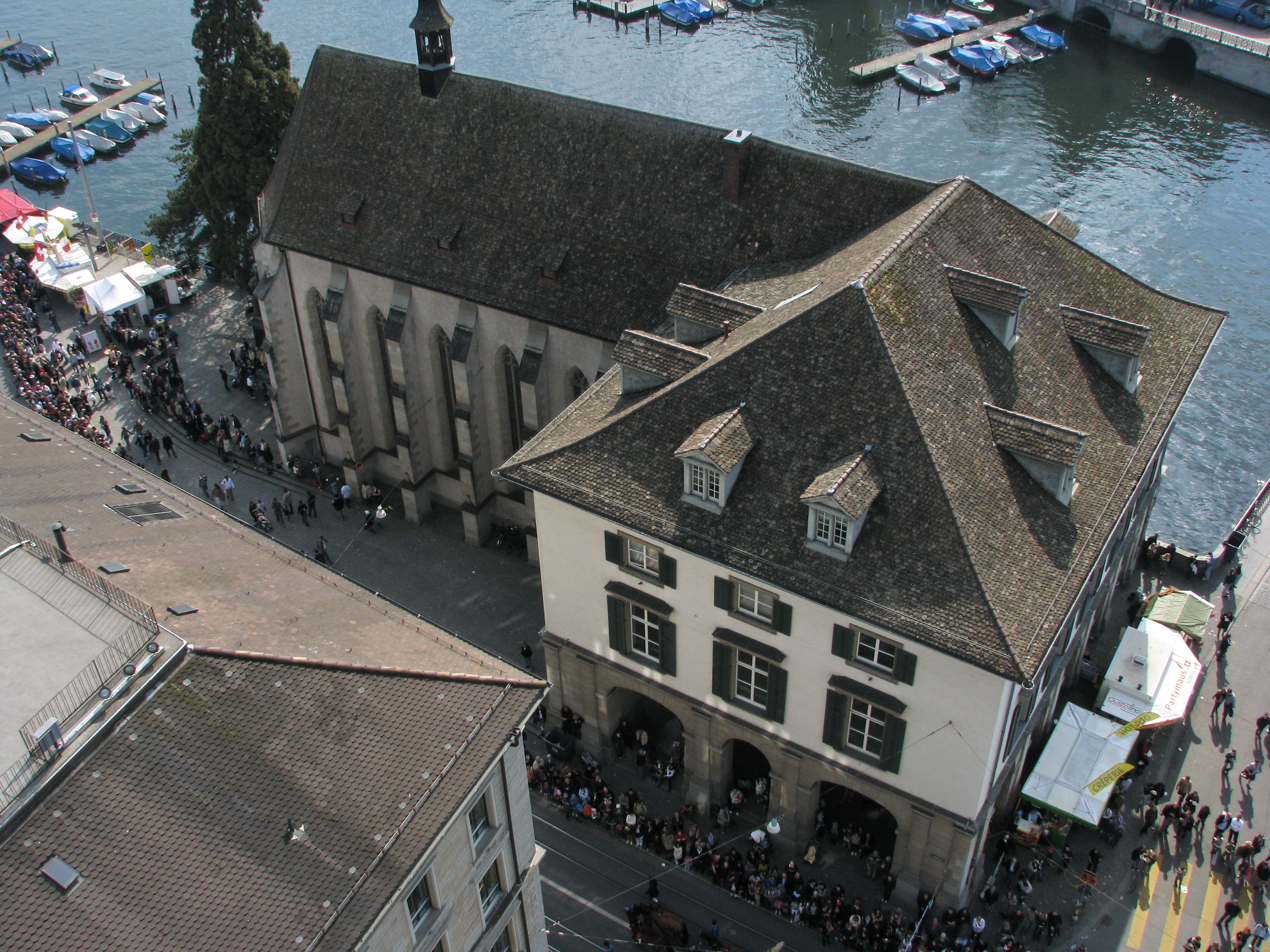
Helmhaus and Wasserkirche as seen from Grossmünster

The Helmhaus is an extension of the church to the north, first mentioned in 1253 as a court of criminal justice, at which time it was a simple wooden structure covering the eastern end of the bridge. It was extended to a larger wooden structure in 1563, and replaced with a stonework hall in 1791.

== Cultural heritage of national importance ==
The building Helmhaus und Wasserkirche is listed in the Swiss inventory of cultural property of national and regional significance as a Class A object of national importance.

== Literature ==
- Konrad Escher, Die Kunstdenkmäler des Kantons Zürich, vol. IV, "Die Stadt Zürich", Basel 1939, pp. 300–310.
- Dieter Nievergelt, Jürg E. Schneider: Wasserkirche und Helmhaus zu Zürich. (Schweizerischer Kunstführer, Serie 44, Nr. 435/436). Ed. by the Gesellschaft für Schweizerische Kunstgeschichte GSK. Bern 2003, ISBN 978-3-85782-435-7
- E. Vogt und H. Herter: Wasserkirche und Helmhaus in Zürich. Baugeschichte im Auftrag der Stadt Zürich verfasst von E. Vogt und H. Herter. Zürich 1943.
- Ulrich Helfenstein: Geschichte der Wasserkirche und der Stadtbibliothek in Zürich. Mit Wiedergabe des Originaltitels von Salomon Vögelin aus dem Jahre 1848. Zürich 1961.
- Manuel Maissen: Vaults on the Water: A systematic analysis of the vault construction in the Wasserkirche Zurich. In: Mascarenhas-Mateus, J., et al. (Eds.): History of Construction Cultures: Proceedings of the 7th International Congress on Construction History, 2021, Lisbon, Portugal. London: CRC Press, 2021, Vol. II, pp. 349–355.
