= Zunfthaus zur Zimmerleuten =

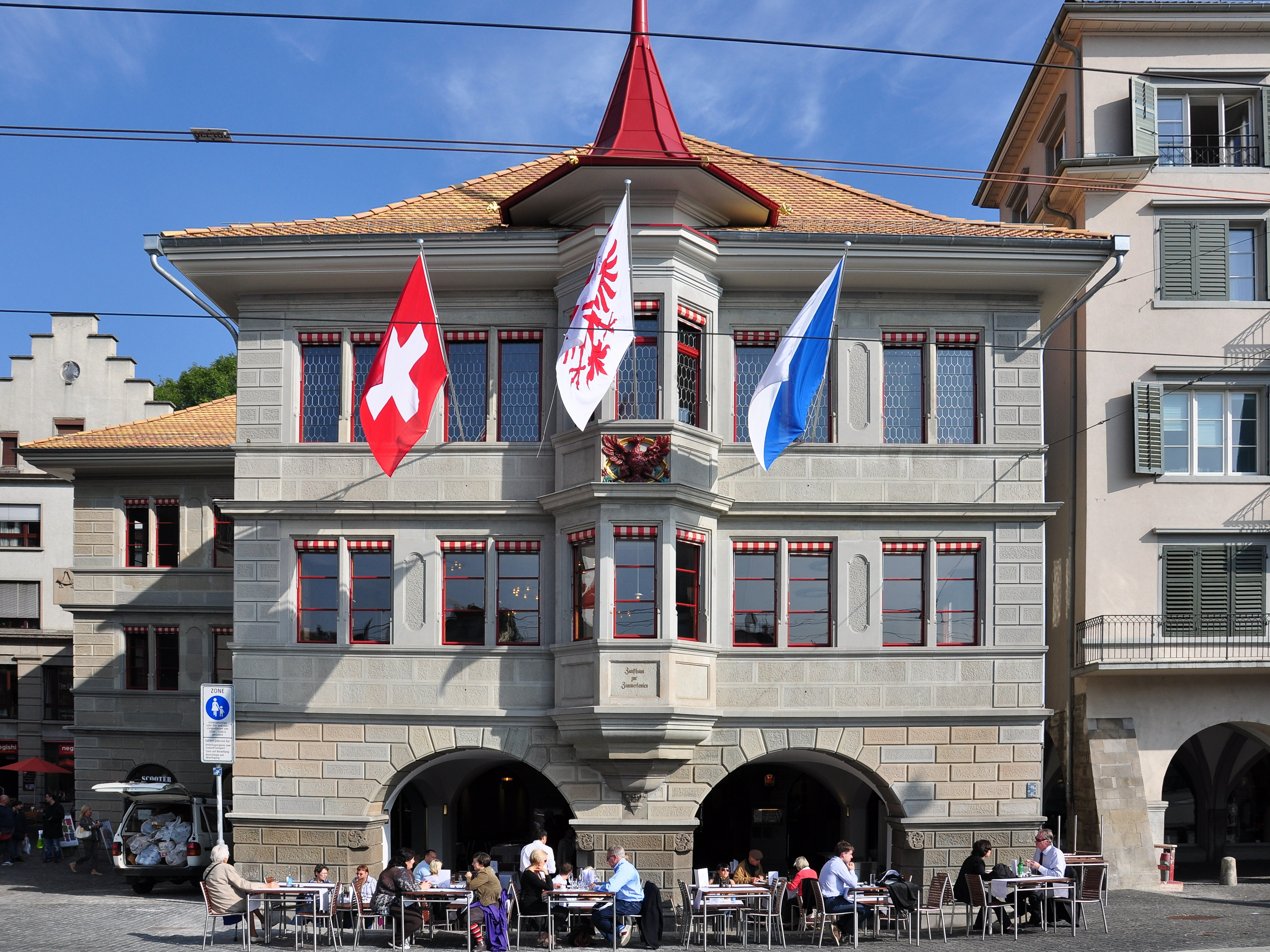
- Zunfthaus zur Zimmerleuten as seen from Limmatquai
- Interactive map of Zunfthaus zur Zimmerleuten
- 47°22′14.2″N 8°32′34.7″E
- Location: Limmatquai

History
- Built: c. 14th century

Site notes
- Architectural styles: European Medieval, renewed 2007—2010
- Governing body: Zunft zur Zimmerleuten

The Zunfthaus zur Zimmerleuten at the Limmatquai promenade in Zurich, Switzerland, situated between Münsterbrücke and Rathausbrücke, is the guild house of the Zunft zur Zimmerleuten, meaning the guild of the carpenters. Neighboured by the Saffran, Kämbel and Rüden guild houses, it is one of the city's historically notable buildings. The building also houses the relatively expensive restaurant of the same name.

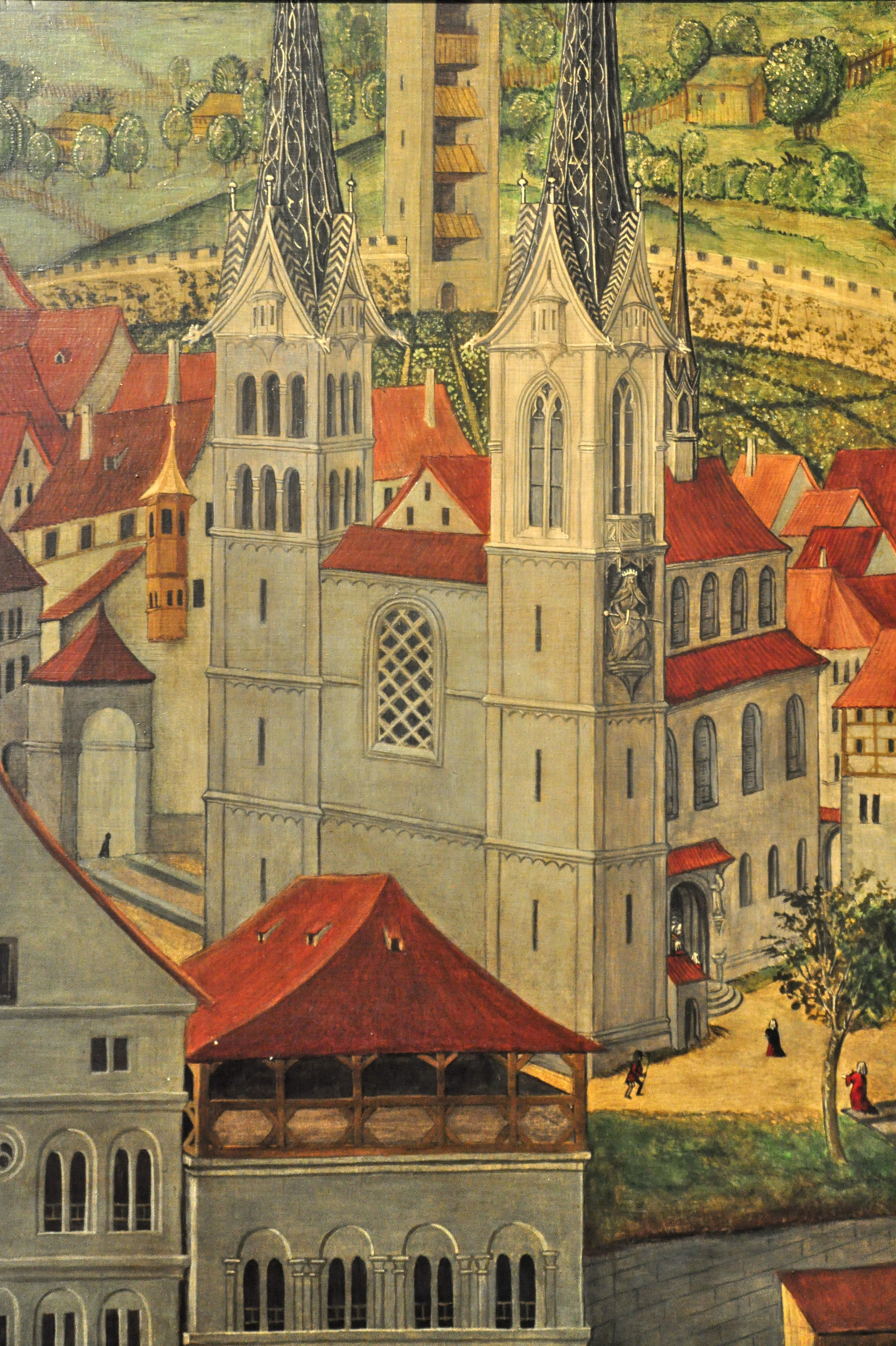
Grossmünster and Zimmerleuten by Hans Leu d.Ä., showing situation in the late 1490s

== History ==
The guild house was built in the 14th century as a representative building of the Zunft zur Zimmerleuten on the Limmat river's right hand (downstream) shore in the today's Rathaus quarter, in the immediate neighborhood of the Grossmünster church, the Rathaus and the Haus zum Rüden, being then the most important buildings in Zurich. The guild house was first mentioned in a document dated 1416 AD.

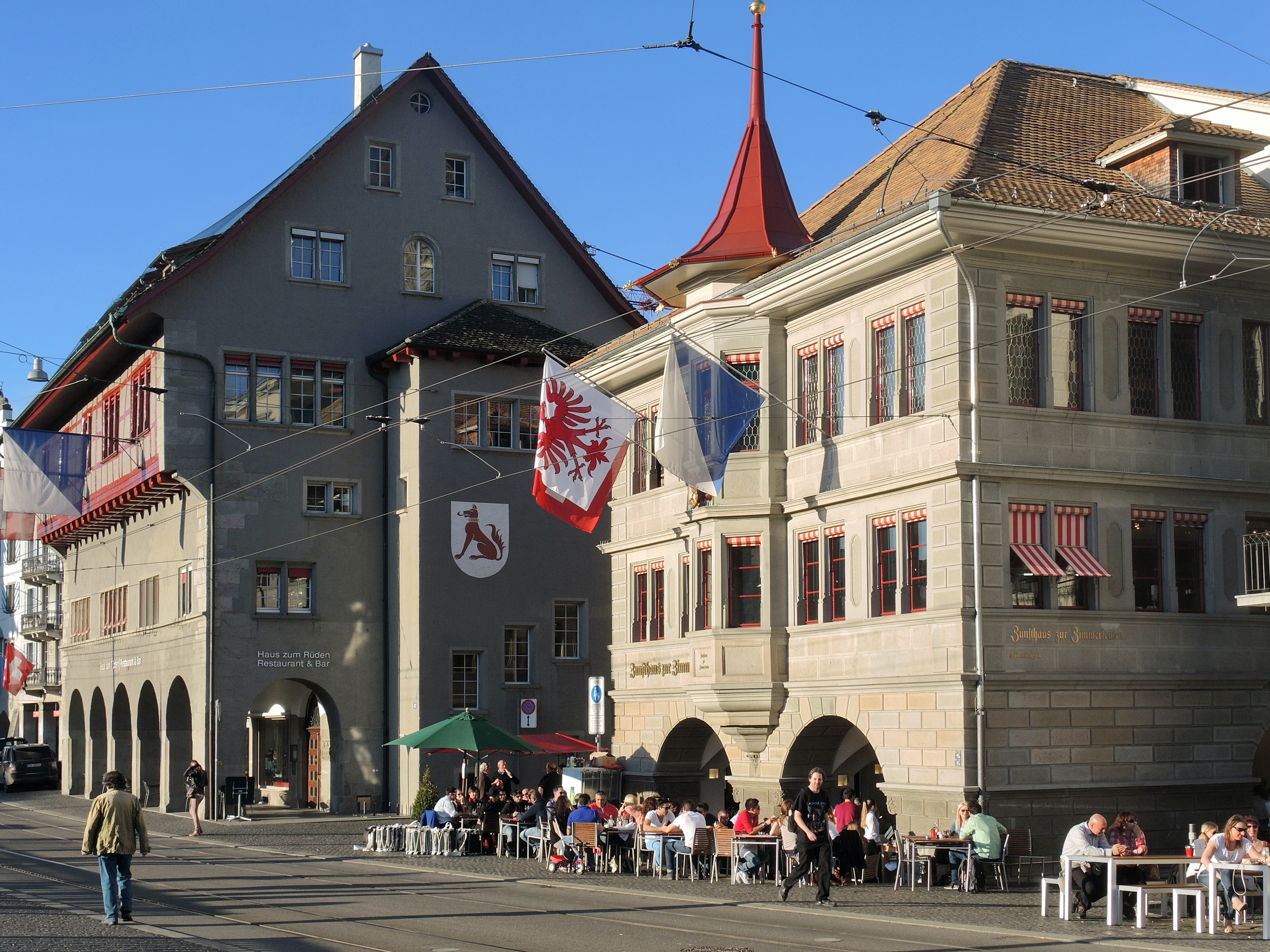
Zunfthaus zur Zimmerleuten and Haus zum Rüden as seen from Münsterbrücke

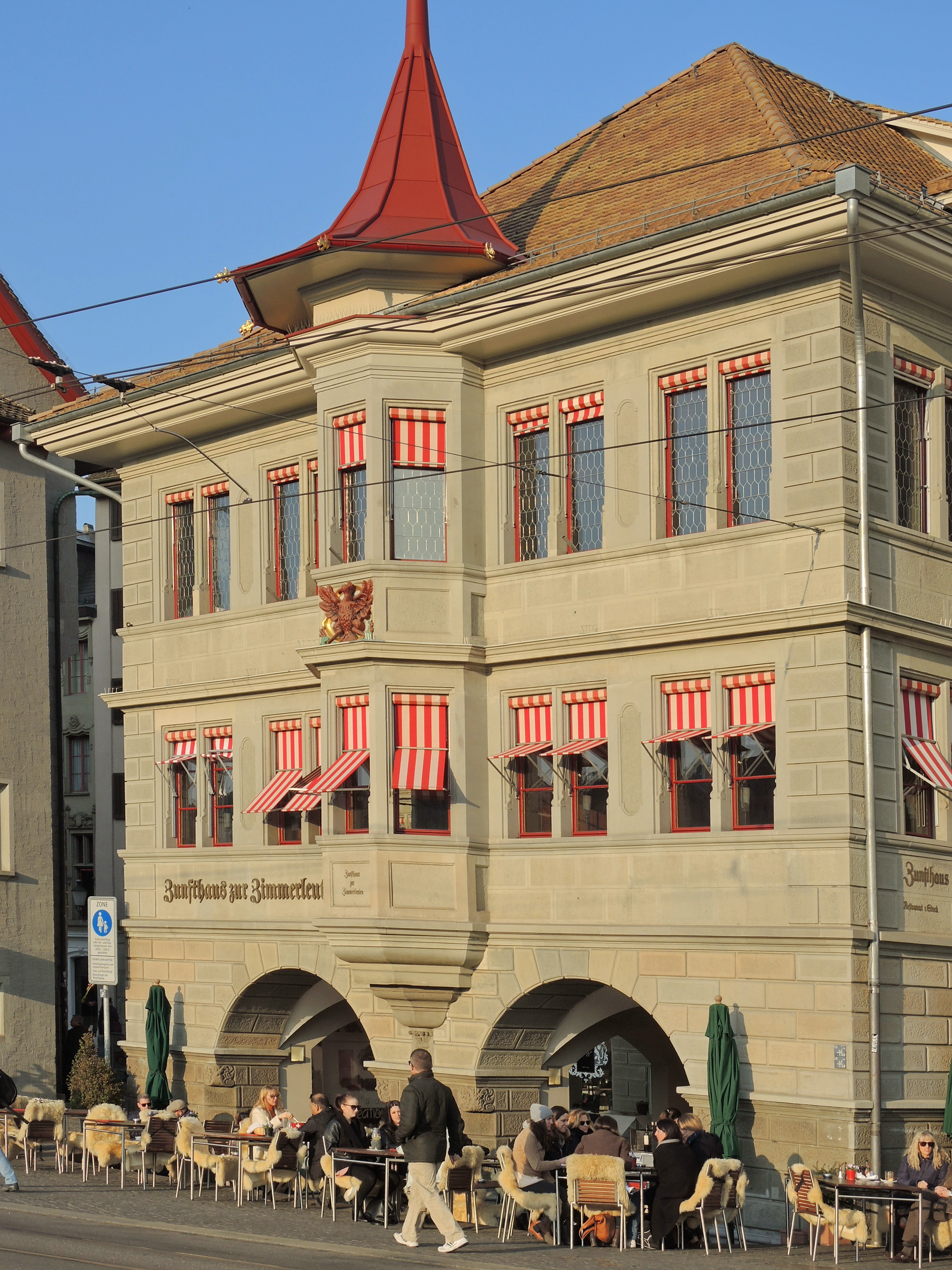
Exterior

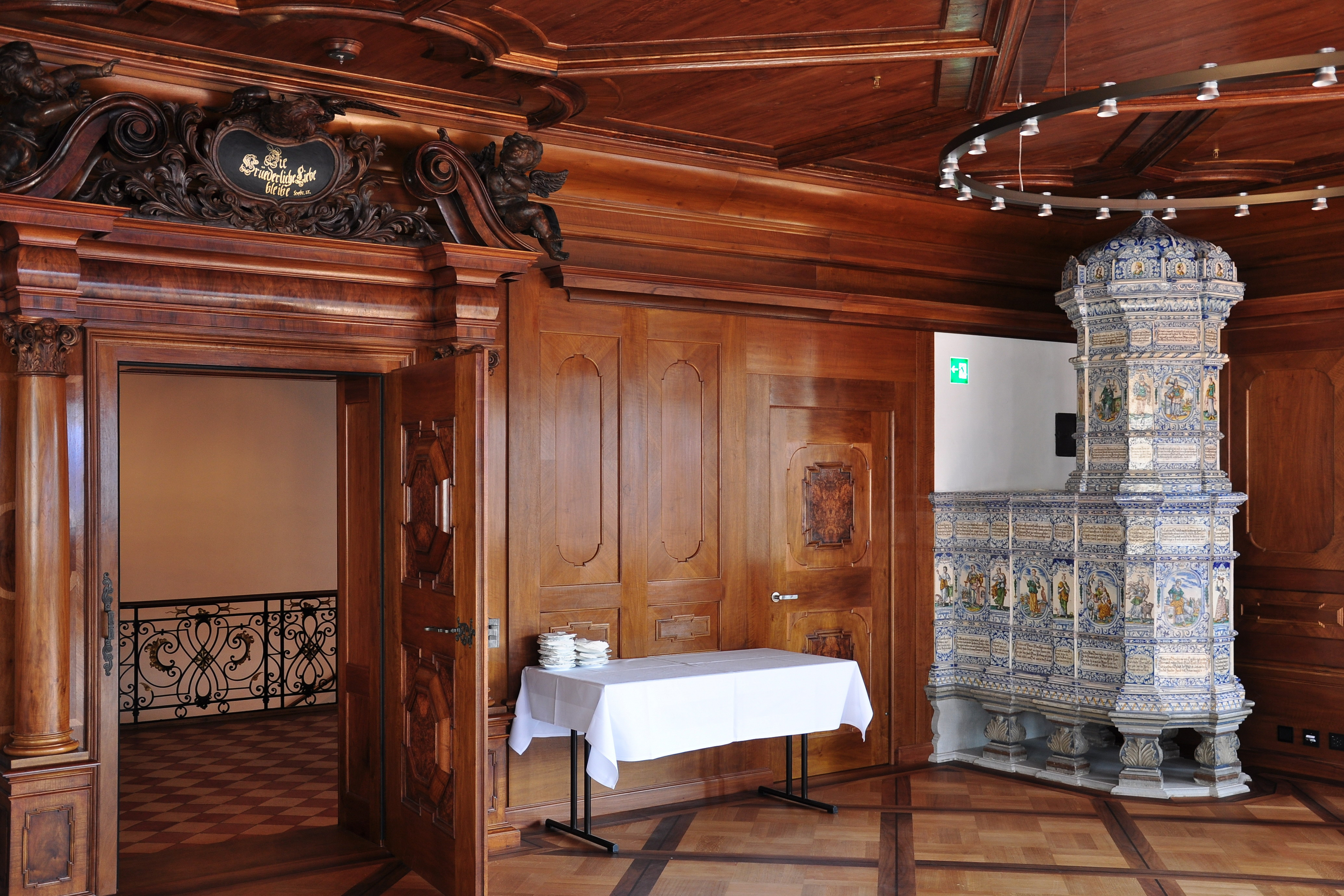
Interior after 2010 renovation

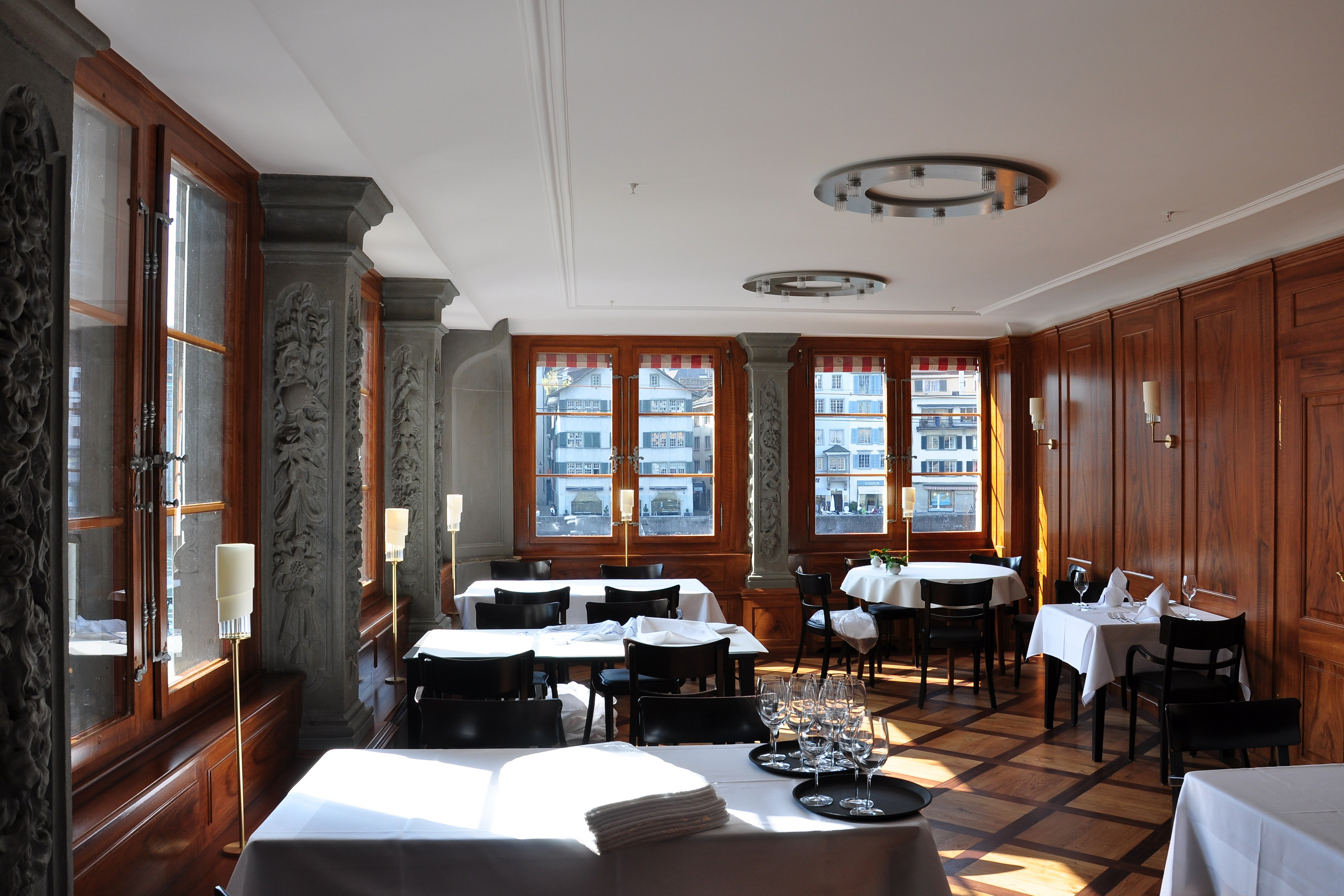
Interior after 2010 renovation

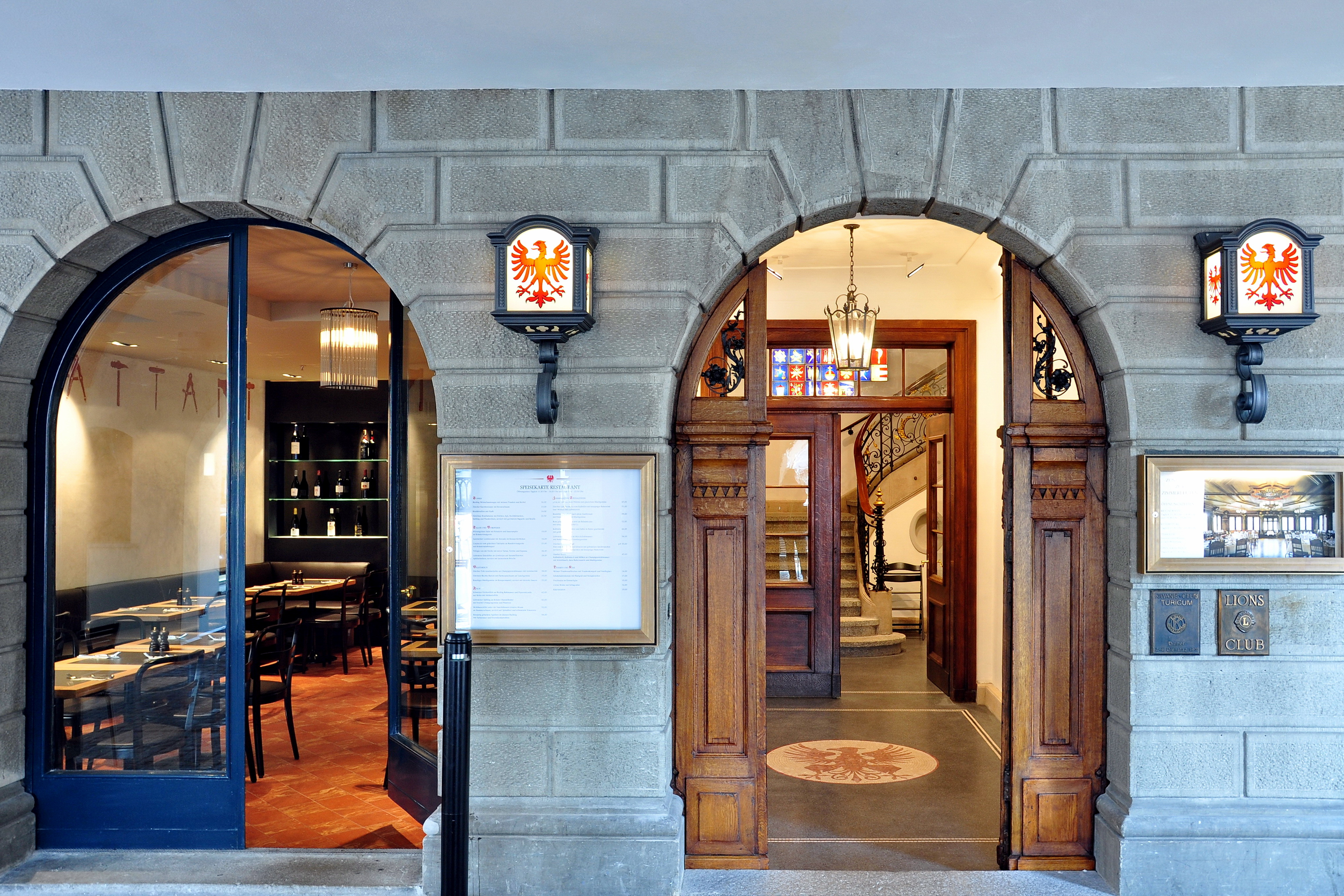
Entrance after 2010 renovation

In 2007 the building was partially destroyed by a fire, renovated and re-opened in 2010.

== Cultural heritage ==
The building is listed in the Swiss inventory of cultural property of national and regional significance as a Class A object.

== Literature ==
- Markus Brühlmeier, Beat Frei: Das Zürcher Zunftwesen. Verlag Neue Zürcher Zeitung, Zürich 2005. ISBN 3-03823-171-1.
