= Münsterbrücke, Zurich =

Münsterbrücke
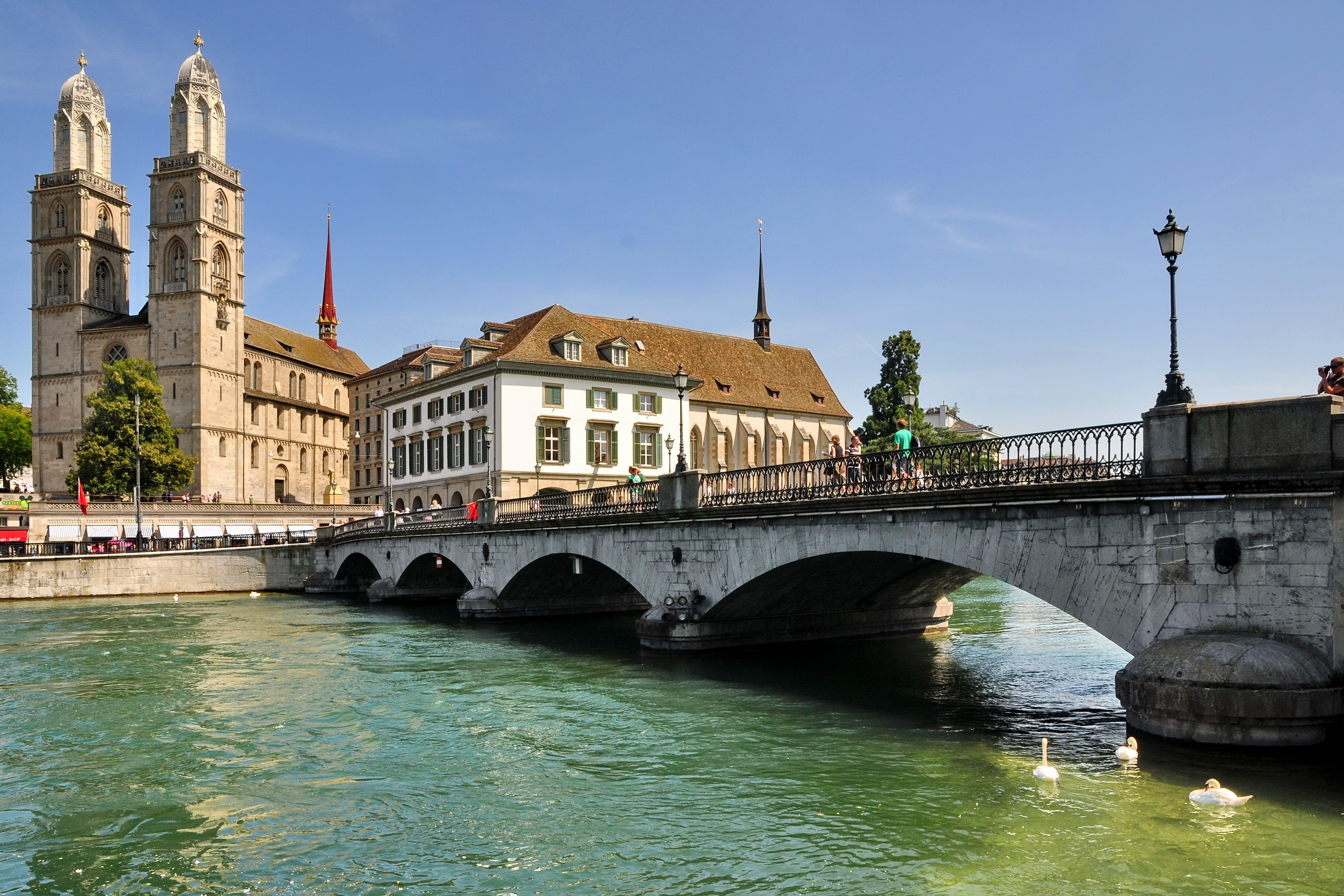
- Münsterbrücke as seen from the left bank (Wühre) towards Grossmünster-Wasserkirche and Limmatquai
- Coordinates: 47°22′12″N 8°32′35″E
- Carries: Two lanes for road traffic and pedestrians
- Crosses: Limmat
- Locale: Zurich, Switzerland
- Official name: Münsterbrücke
- Owner: City of Zurich
- Maintained by: City of Zurich
- Preceded by: Quaibrücke
- Followed by: Rathausbrücke

Characteristics
- Material: Stone
- No. of spans: 4

History
- Designer: Alois Negrelli
- Engineering design by: Conrad Stadler, Johann Jakob Locher-Oeri
- Constructed by: Heinrich Staub (Steinmetzmeister)
- Construction start: 1836
- Opened: 1838
- Replaces: Obere Brücke (wooden, pedestrian bridge)

Location
- Interactive map of Münsterbrücke

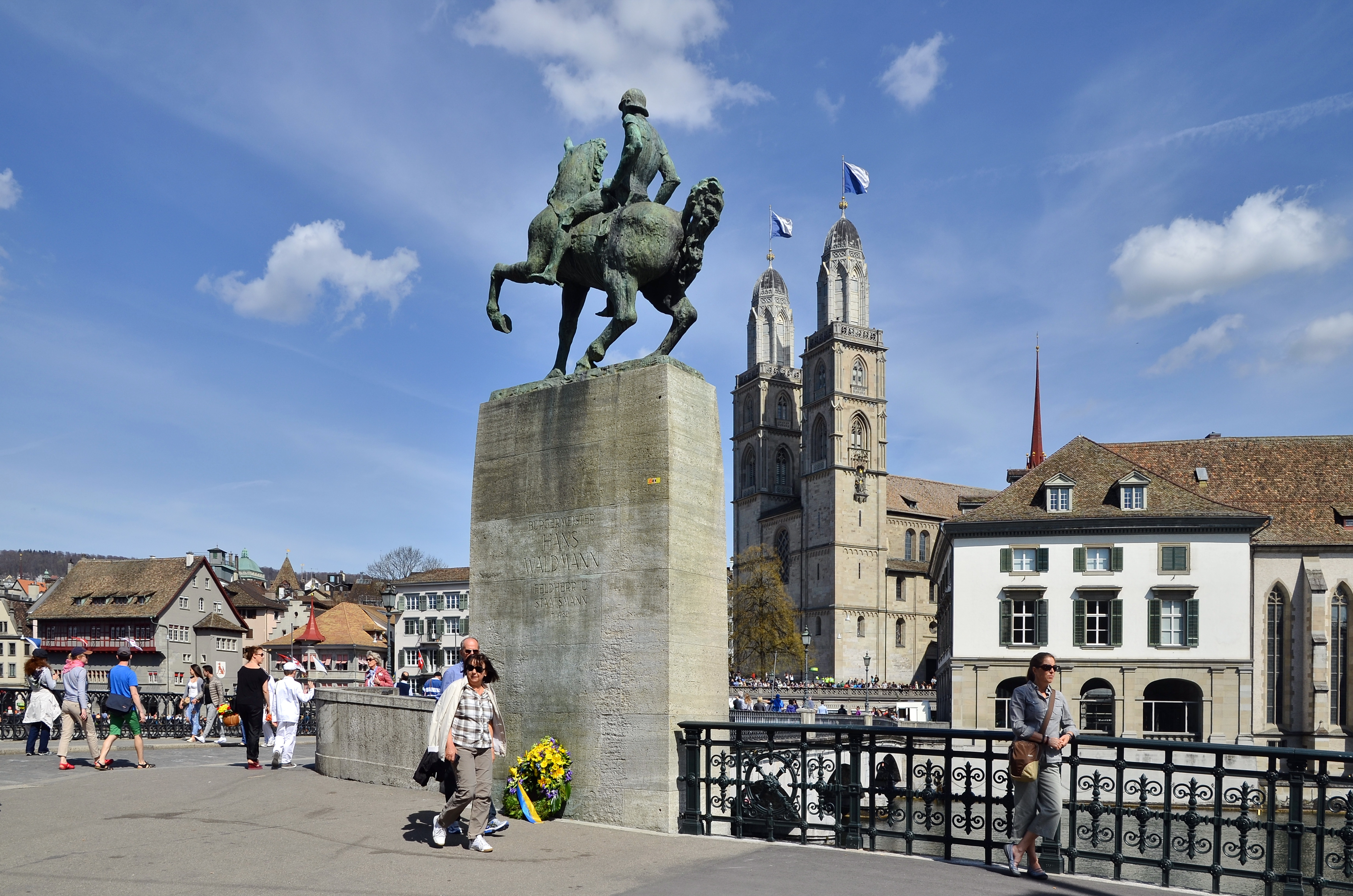
Hermann Haller's Hans Waldman monument from 1937

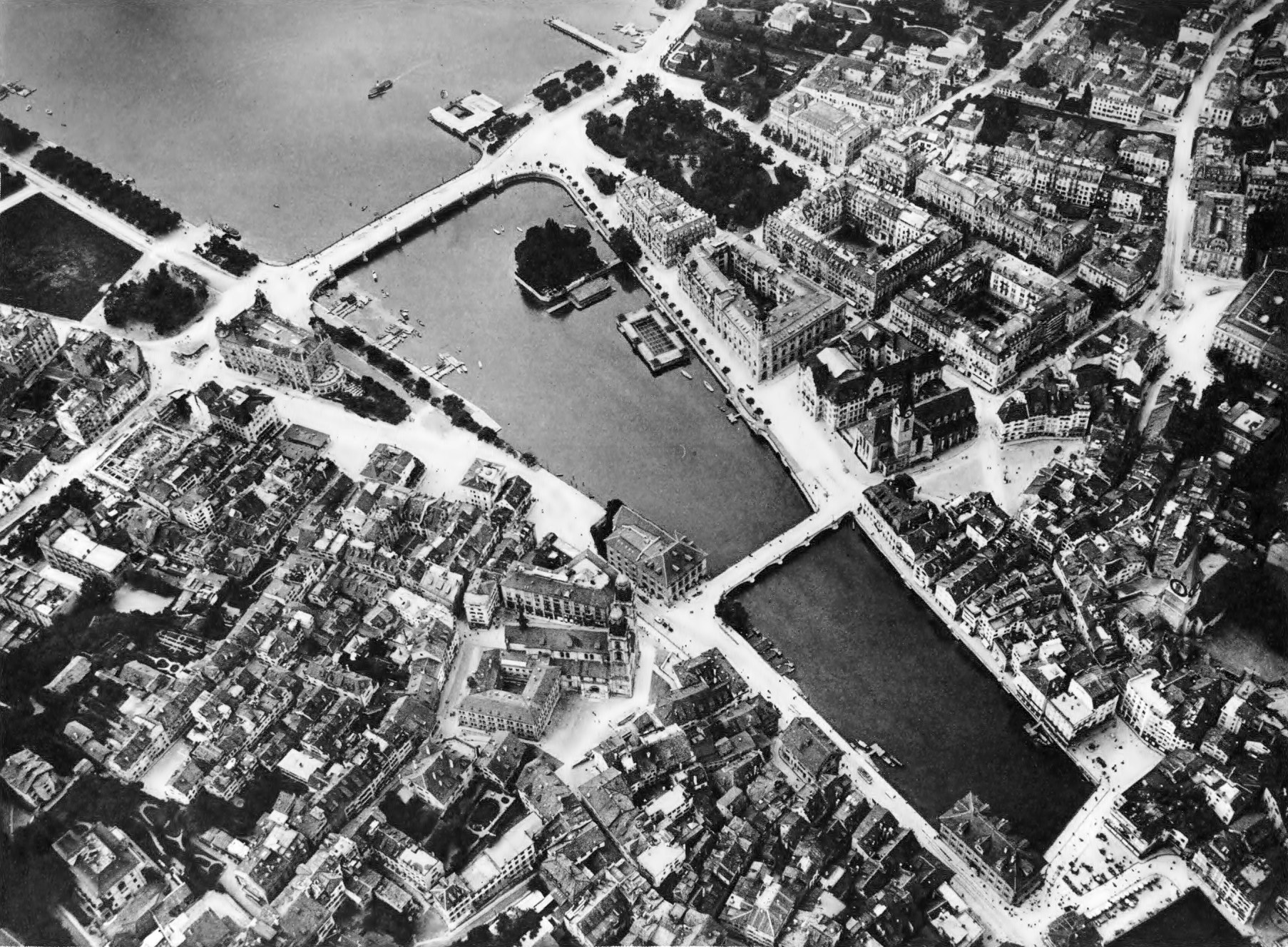
Quaibrücke, Bauschänzli, Münsterbrücke and Rathausbrücke (aerial photograph by Eduard Spelterini, probably late 1890s)

The Münsterbrücke is a pedestrian and road bridge over the Limmat in the city of Zurich, Switzerland. It is listed in the Swiss inventory of cultural property of national and regional significance.

== Geography ==
The Münsterbrücke crosses the Limmat, connecting Münsterhof and Limmatquai at the historical core of the medieval town of Zurich. It is the second bridge over the Limmat, below the Quaibrücke and above the Rathausbrücke. The bridge also directly connects its name-parents, namely the centuries older churches Grossmünster und Fraumünster.

== Transportation ==
Tram lines 2, 4 and 15 run past it on Limmatquai. The ZSG Zürichsee-Schifffahrtsgesellschaft and its Limmat tour boats pass beneath it. Individual transportation is limited to road transport use between upper Limmatquai (Bellevueplatz), upstream of the Limmat, and Münsterhof, since the area is part of the pedestrian zone of Zurich.

== Architecture ==
In 1835, the chief engineer of the merchant society of the city of Zurich, Alois Negrelli, initiated the construction of the bridge in collaboration with the master-builders Conrad Stadler and Johann Jakob Locher-Oeri, who engineered the sophisticated wooden scaffold. The foundations of the bridge were based on 472 oak piles with a length of up to 15.6 m (51 ft), to bear its weight of about 6,100 tons. The foundation was filled with concrete, and the spaces between the piles were reinforced with rubblestones. Above that, cofferdams and caissons were erected and reinforced by sandstone plates that lay on cement mortar. The structure consists of four flat arches with a 15 m (49 ft) inside diameter and a height of 2.1 m (6 ft 11 in) above the Limmat level, and a fifth arch of 9.9 m (32 ft) above a former channel into the former Kornhaus building opposite the Fraumünster church. The pillars between the arches have a diameter of 2.4 m (7 ft 10 in) and are protected by a layer of cement and paneled with black Jura marble. The pillars and cornices and the stones of the traffic lane are made of St. Gotthard granite. The cast-iron railings were produced in the Grand Duchy of Baden.

The present bridge has two lanes and sidewalks on both sides, but it is commonly used as a pedestrian and bicycle bridge as road transport is limited between Limmatquai and Münsterhof.

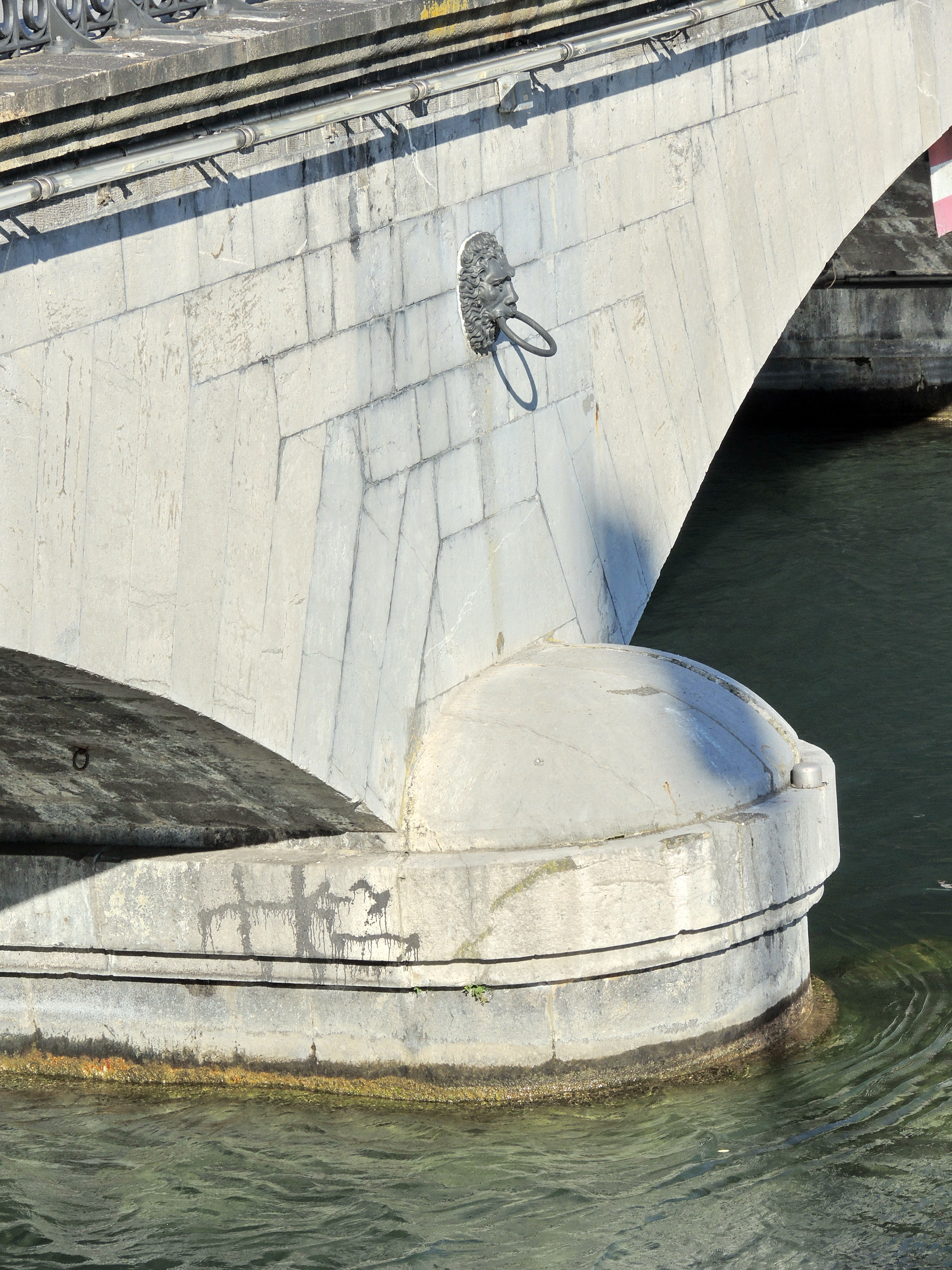
One of the bridge's supports

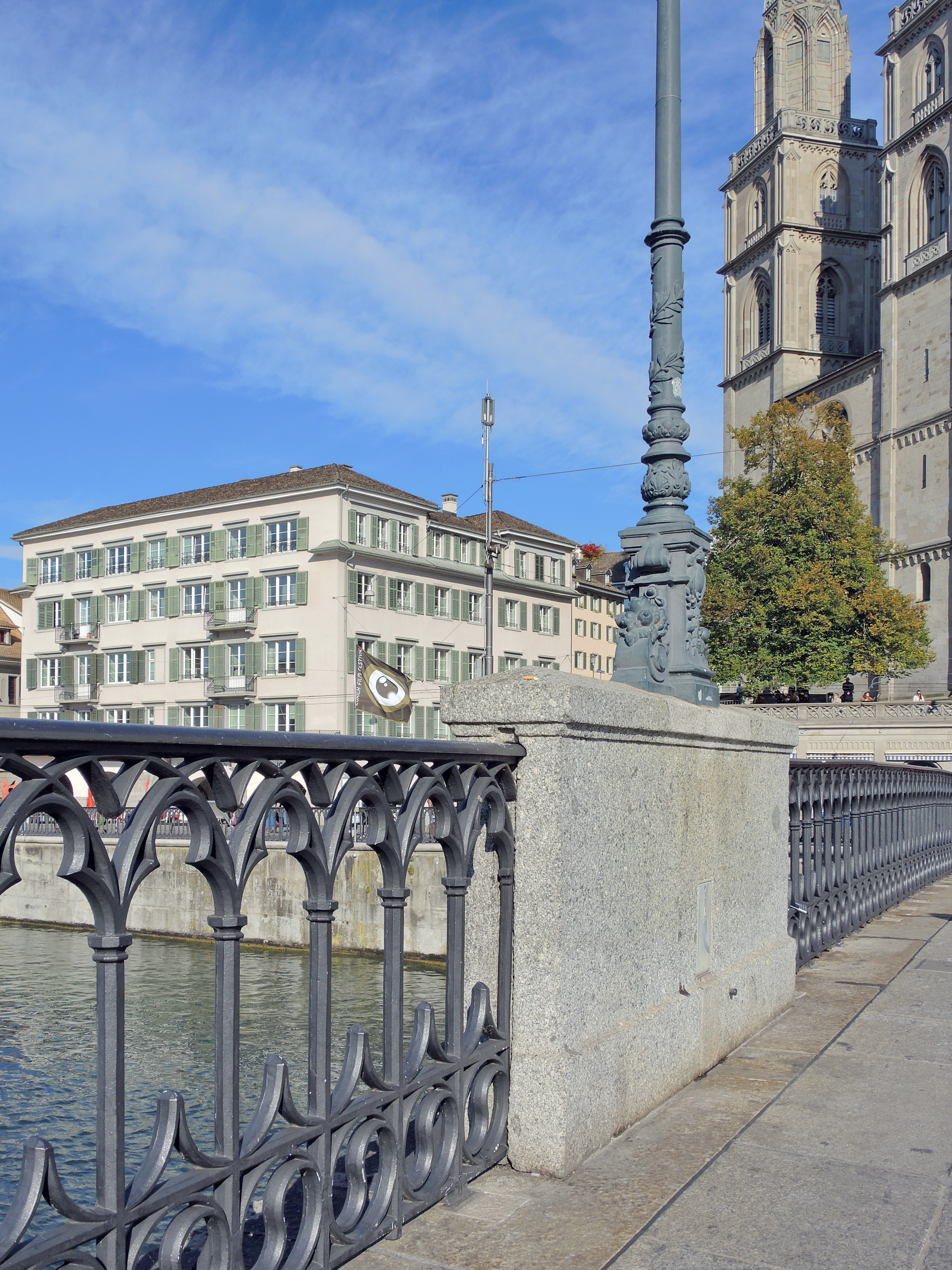
Cast-iron railings

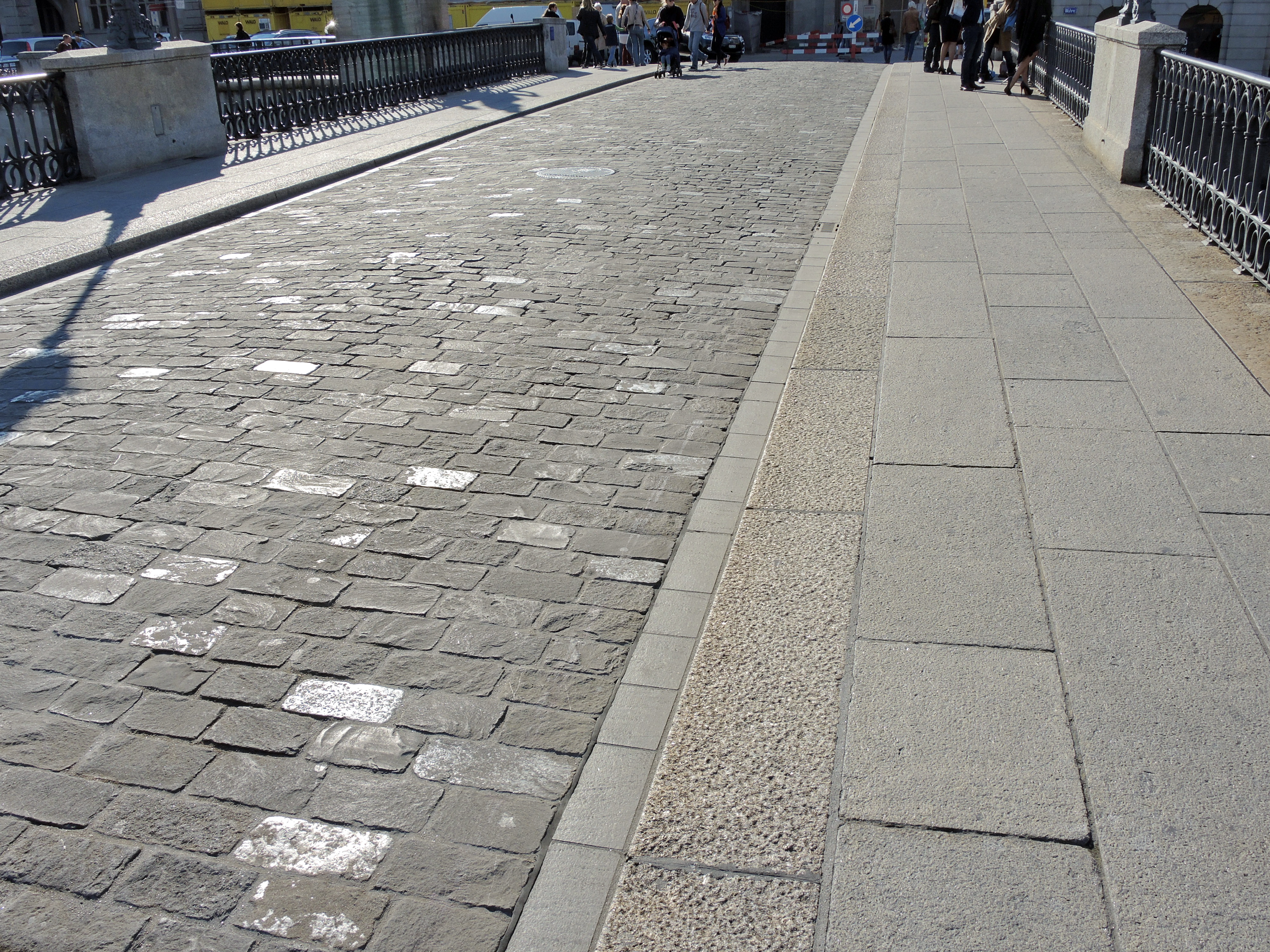
Traffic lane made of St. Gotthard granite.

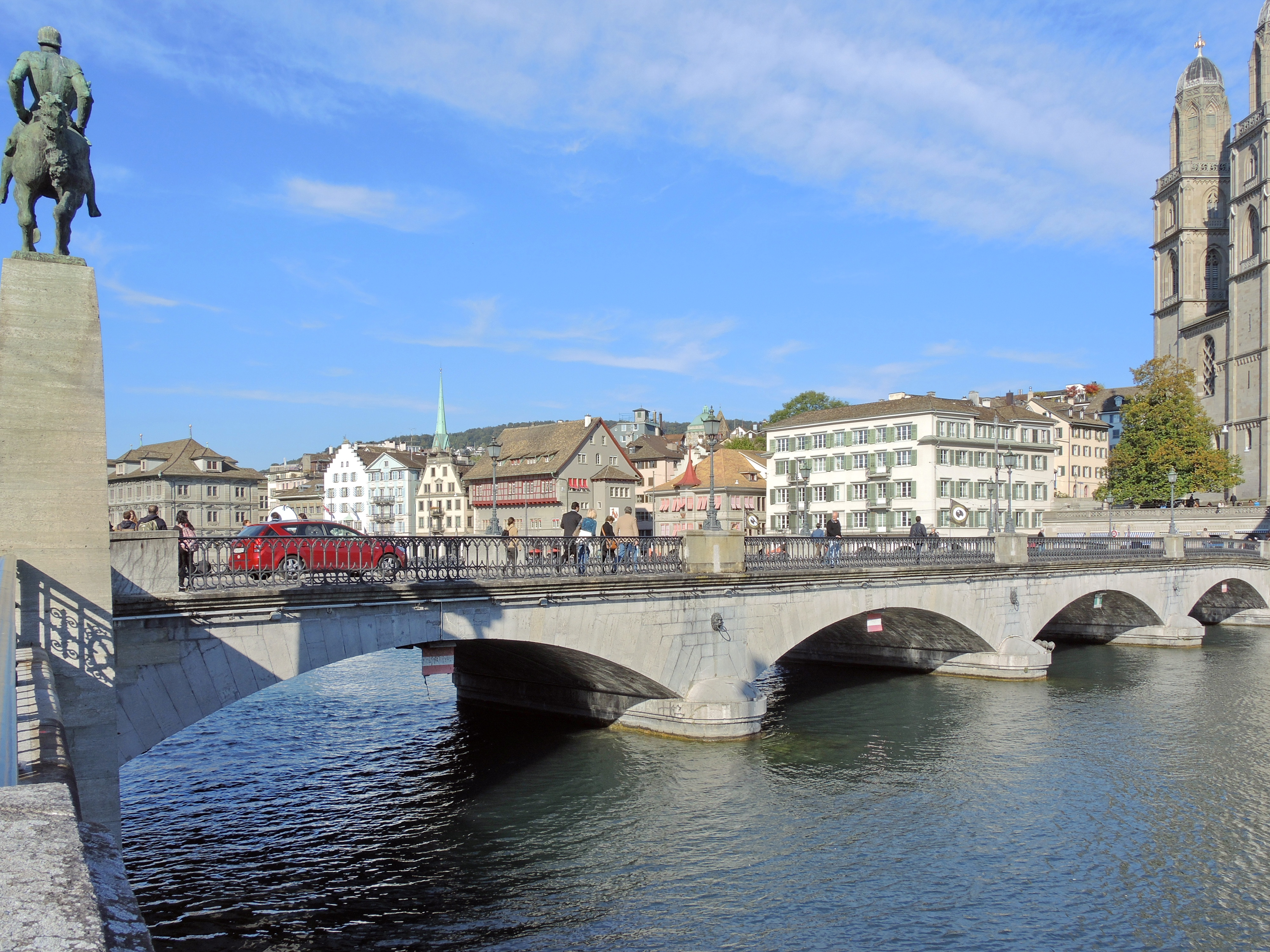
View from Stadthausquai looking downstream

The Hans Waldmann (1435–1489) equestrian monument in front of the Fraumünster church was unveiled by the Kämbel guild on 6 April 1937 at the site of the former Fraumünster Kornhaus (granary), which was torn down in 1897, above the fifth arch of the bridge.

== History ==
The earliest bridge at the location was built in the Roman era, and in medieval Zurich a wooden bridge, called the Obere Brücke (upper bridge), connected the two banks of the Limmat. Between 1836 and 1838, the former wooden bridge was replaced by a stone bridge. Alois Negrelli engineered and supervised the construction of the bridge as it is still present today; it was inaugurated in August 1838. The bridge congested the traffic on the Limmat, so a land connection in the then "modern" Zurich was urgently needed by replacing the narrow medieval Reichsstrasse towards the present Rathausbrücke crossing. Thus, sections of the present Limmatquai on the eastern shore of the Limmat were built simultaneously.

Starting in 1861, the Fraumünster granary temporarily housed in one of its numerous empty rooms the Betraum of the Jewish citizens of Zurich until the Synagoge Zürich Löwenstrasse was built in 1881. Until May 1901 and between 1910 and 1924 there was even a tramway crossing the bridge towards Paradeplatz. The original construction has been repaired several times, most recently in the late 1990s.

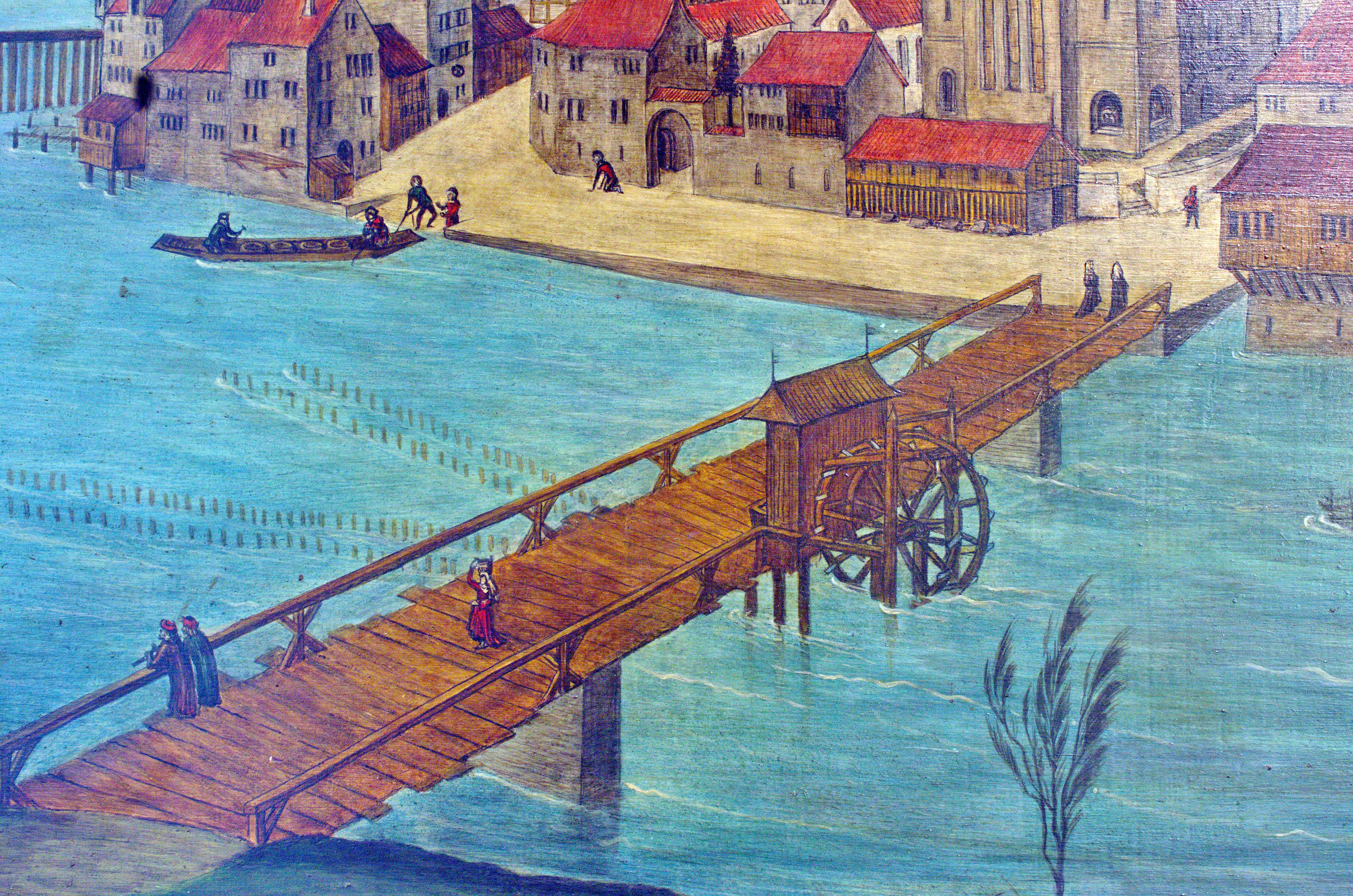
Wooden medieval bridge (Obere Brücke) between Münsterhof/Fraumünster and Grossmünster (Altarbild by Hans Leu d.Ä., late 15th century)

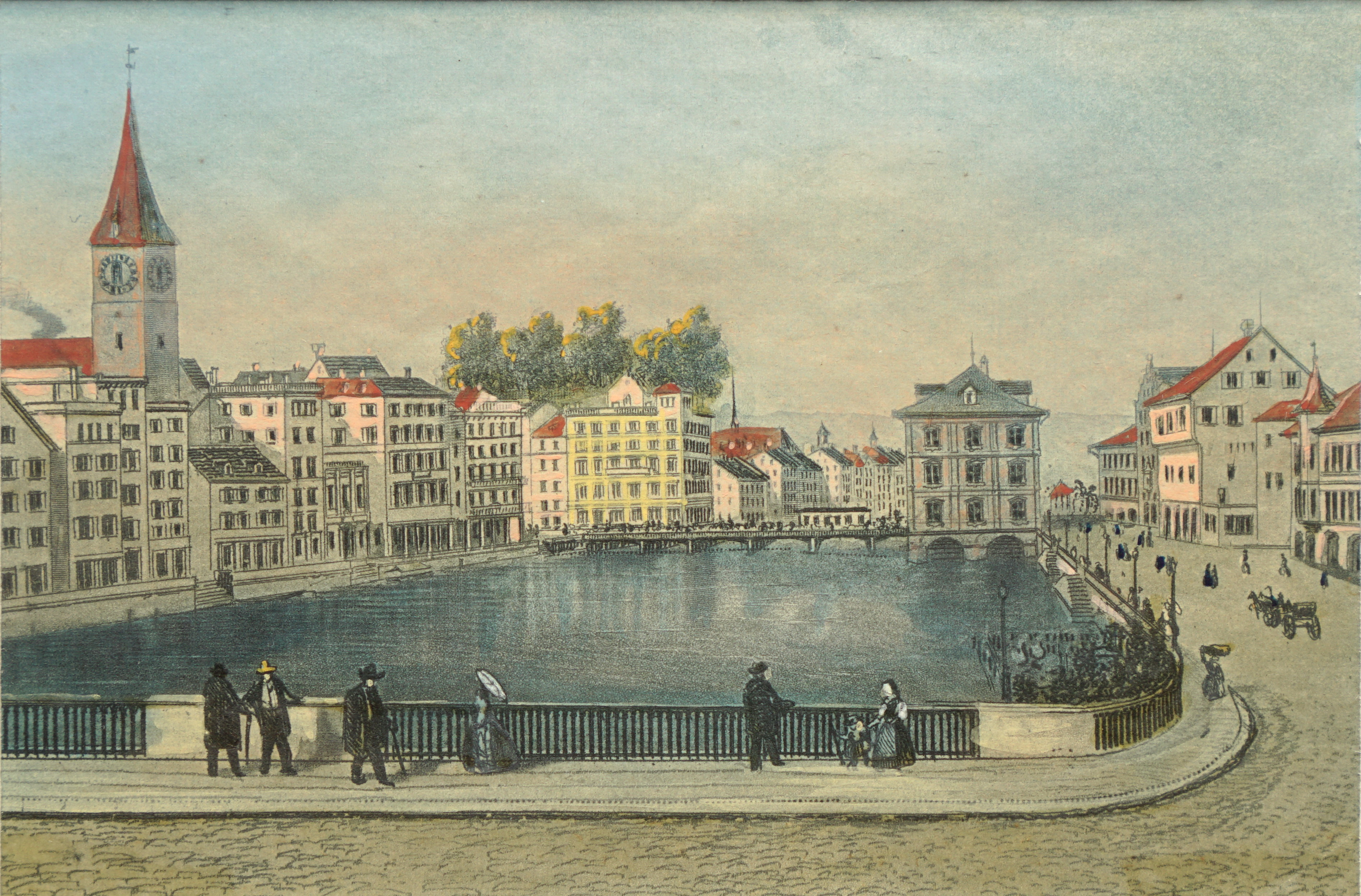
View from Münsterbrücke, looking downstream, c. 1882: St. Peter, Haus zum Schwert (centre), Rathausbrücke, Rathaus, Haus zum Rüden. Etching by Heinrich Müller

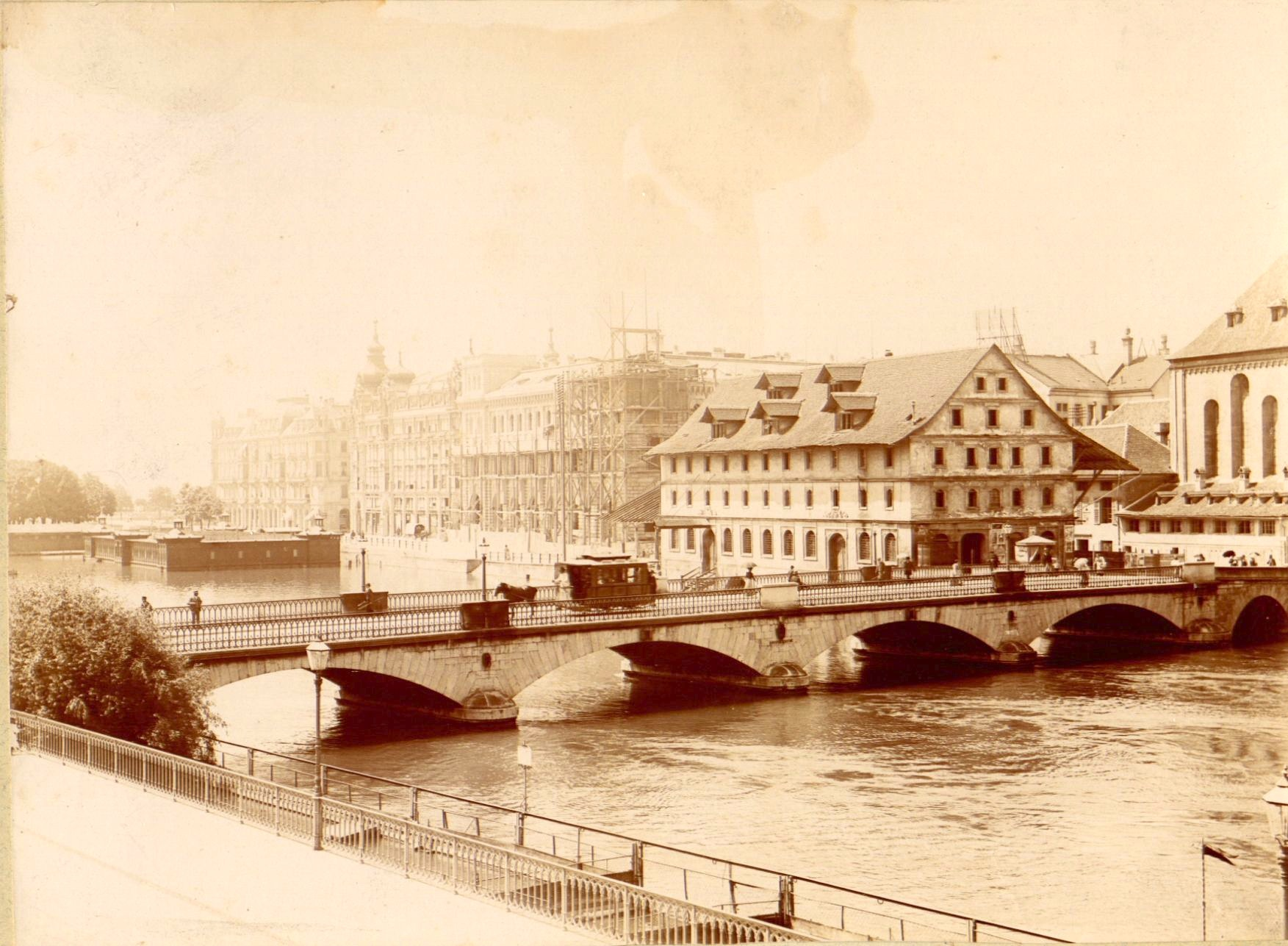
Münsterbrücke with horsecar, c. 1896

== Cultural heritage of national importance ==
The Münsterbrücke is listed in the Swiss inventory of cultural property of national and regional significance as a Class A object of national importance.

== See also ==
- List of bridges in Switzerland
