= Andreas Schmid (merchant) =

Swiss merchant and magistrate (1504–1565)

- Born: 1504; Zürich, Switzerland
- Died: 31 May 1565 (aged 60–61); Zürich, Switzerland
- Occupations: Merchant, magistrate, bailiff

Andreas Schmid (1504 – 31 May 1565) was a Swiss merchant and magistrate from Zürich. He held various offices in the city, serving on its court and Grand Council and as bailiff of several territories.

== Biography ==
Schmid was the son of Felix Schmid and held the rank of Junker. He married four times: first Catharina Wyss, daughter of Matthias Wyss; second Anna Schärer, daughter of Hans, a cloth merchant; third Barbara Meiss, daughter of Hans, a Junker; and fourth Elisabeth Graf. A merchant by profession, he studied at Tübingen from 1517 to 1519.

Schmid was a member of the city court of Zürich (1526–1527) and a banneret from 1531. He represented the Konstaffel in the Grand Council (1534–1552 and 1560–1565), and served as bailiff of Kyburg (1554–1560), Baden (1537–1539), and Sargans (1540). From 1562 he was auditor of the noble society of the Schildner zum Schneggen.

== Bibliography ==
- A. Corrodi-Sulzer, "Die Vorfahren des Bürgermeisters Felix Schmid", in ZTb 1937, 1936, 10–40
