= History of artisanship in Switzerland =

Evolution of Swiss crafts and trades

The history of artisanship in Switzerland encompasses the development of manual trades and artisanal production from the Middle Ages through the modern era.

From the late Middle Ages to the early 20th century, artisanship was defined as manual work executed using simple tools. The artisan—acting as both entrepreneur and producer—worked alone or with the assistance of journeymen and apprentices, creating goods either on commission for local clientele or as stock for personal sale. Small enterprises directed by masters dominated the sector. Today, the notion of artisanship includes operations of varying size and technical sophistication, primarily in luxury or art products, manufacturing unique pieces on demand or ensuring the maintenance and repair of industrial articles.

== Origins ==
The oldest artisanal tradition on the territory of present-day Switzerland likely dates to prehistory and primarily concerned metalworking. Archaeological excavations have uncovered workshops (circa 300 BC) in Celtic oppida, such as the one on the Enge peninsula in Bern. Glass working, oriented toward export, distinguished itself from other productions of this era through its high quality.

In Gallo-Roman Switzerland (1st century BC to 5th century AD), craftsmanship nourished by Roman traditions spread throughout all colonized territories. In the civitates, vici, and castra, artisans fashioning metal, glass, ceramics, wood, stone, and leather, or creating art objects, worked for local and sometimes distant clientele. This production is attested by archaeological remains, inscriptions, and literary testimonies.

After the great invasions, only high-level craftsmanship (goldsmithing, armory, art trades) capable of rivaling Roman or Byzantine models managed to survive in former cities, courts, or monasteries. For the rest, most artisanal activities were secondary occupations for a population devoted primarily to fieldwork.

== Medieval urban craftsmanship ==
This situation began to change in the 12th century with the wave of new town foundations. Protected by walls and driven by growing demand, craftsmanship gained independence. Following merchants, artisans formed an innovative group that modified the character and architecture of cities, notably through the grouping of sectors in specific streets or quarters (hence names such as Blacksmiths' Street, Tanners' Street, or Bakers' Street). Urban authorities first regulated intramural craftsmanship: under their surveillance, masters sold bread, meat, leather, and textiles in halls near the town hall. Artisan alleys with their shops and specialized markets allowed peasants from surrounding areas to make daily purchases.

Craftsmanship developed rapidly, strengthening in privileged sectors such as food, metals, textiles, and construction. It specialized in new trades, particularly in decorative arts and metallurgy (armorer, spurrier, sword forger, pewterer, bell founder, or cannon founder). By the 13th century, craftsmanship formed the backbone of the urban economy. Some branches became export-oriented in the 14th–15th centuries (cloth-making in Fribourg, silk in Zürich, leather in Bern, scythes in Lucerne). Along with commerce, craftsmanship contributed to urban prosperity in the late Middle Ages.

Trade guilds acquired growing social weight within the bourgeoisie. They grouped by branches into confraternities (first in Basel in 1220) and obtained recognition as an estate ranking after peasants, clergy, knights, and merchants. By organizing politically into guilds, they completed their establishment in the 14th–15th centuries; everywhere, artisans participated in political as well as economic decisions: through direct representation in guild cities, or through personal influence in councils when a guild constitution was lacking. Furthermore, anyone wishing to practice a trade had to first be admitted into a guild.

This evolution was specific to German-speaking Switzerland, where guilds were strongly influenced by the German model, making socio-economic development similar to that of regions north of the Rhine. Religious confraternities of southern and western Switzerland never managed to acquire comparable political and economic weight. Only in the 16th century did the jurandes and maîtrises of Geneva, Lausanne, and Neuchâtel align with the model of French, Savoyard, and Confederate cities, though their political influence remained modest.

== Crisis measures and trade regulation ==
As a consequence of the accelerated formation of territorial states around cities, the crisis of the urban economy in the late Middle Ages marked a first fracture. In the 1460s, signs of depression and threats of competition multiplied. At Lucerne (1463/1471), Zürich (1460s), Bern (1464/1467), and Fribourg (1505), artisans attempted to eliminate rural craftsmanship and country markets—considered insignificant until then—to secure a monopoly on artisanal-commercial activities. This policy remained inoperative: in Zürich, it was swept away in 1489 by the peasant uprising against Hans Waldmann.

In contrast, social tensions within urban craftsmanship itself had a more lasting effect. Large enterprises (counting numerous journeymen, apprentices, and laborers) flourished alongside "poor" masters short of commissions. The latter blamed their misfortunes on the accumulation of production and commerce practiced by "rich" artisans and expected salvation only in an "equitable"—that is, egalitarian—sharing of work, income, and charges. Their demand for a "just" economic order was inspired by socio-religious currents appearing in Imperial cities. Here as there, it resulted in dirigiste regulation of economic activities.

The new system was built in stages, as in Rhenish cities. Basel, Zürich, and Lucerne took the lead during the second half of the 15th century; other cities, both guild and patrician, followed in the 16th–17th centuries. Various regulations were enacted during economic collapses, especially during the recessions of the 1460s, the decades of 1560–1580, and the period following 1690. These persisted even after the crises passed. Directed against the freedom of enterprise inherited from the Middle Ages, they gradually narrowed the field of action for artisans.

Thus, the prohibition of accumulating "small" and "large" trades—pronounced for the first time in Basel in 1491—meant the artisan could sell only his own products and the merchant could not manufacture them. Added to this was the prohibition of associating in small commerce or having several people exploiting the same workshop, even between father and son. Then, in the 16th–17th centuries, came the obligation to adhere to small enterprises counting no more than three or four jobs and the rationing of raw materials: cereals for bakers, livestock for butchers, tan and hides for tanners. Each trade was assigned severely delimited activities to avoid all competition. The obstacles to competition had the corollary of privileging guild members only, leading to prosecution against unaffiliated foreigners, rural artisans, and peddlers. Established masters were charged by authorities with defining quality standards and verifying respect for them, while the authorities reserved the right to fix and surveil prices and wages. From the 16th–17th centuries, each trade body had a professional regulation approved by the council.

In Romandy, guilds and trade regulations appeared only in the 16th century: in Geneva, under pressure from authorities and at the request of Huguenot refugees, while Neuchâtel and Lausanne were inspired by the model of Alemannic cities. Overall, the history of French-speaking Swiss craftsmanship remains little known, as researchers have until now privileged branches oriented toward export—such as textiles, watchmaking, or art craftsmanship in Geneva, and mines and the iron and steel industry in Neuchâtel—sectors relating more to manufacture and industry than to craftsmanship. If southern Switzerland produced artisans of European renown—architects, masons, stonecutters, stucco workers, etc.—whom a lack of commissions constrained to emigrate (forming their own guilds such as the Lombard-Swiss confraternities of building artisans throughout Europe in the 16th century), craftsmanship remained largely unorganized in Ticino itself.

Regulation did not succeed in imposing the expected "just order." Under the Ancien Régime, there were still rich masters and poor masters. Lucrative trades like blacksmith, furrier, tanner, dyer, and miller managed to reserve the raw materials trade for themselves, while "poor" trades such as tailor, shoemaker, carpenter, joiner, ropemaker, or weaver remained heavily congested. New provisions certainly brought an initial stimulus to craftsmanship (notably the rises of the 1620s–1640s and 1660s–1670s), but the prohibition of trading and limitation to small enterprises had the inevitable consequence of fostering new forms of production in the 16th and 17th centuries, such as manufacture and dispersed rural industry (putting-out system), which operated outside craftsmanship and finally in competition with it.

== Training ==
Training, encompassing apprenticeship and journeymanship, was regulated on the German model from the end of the 15th century among saddlers, coppersmiths, stove makers, and others, before being generalized in the 16th century. It was overseen by guilds. Apprenticeship was preceded by a trial period, at the end of which the candidate was formally hired as an apprentice in the presence of the mastery. Once apprenticeship was completed, the master "acquitted" his apprentice before the same college and sent him to accomplish his journeyman tour. Regulation determined only the broad lines (three or four years of apprenticeship); details (precise duration, apprenticeship fees, board and lodging at the master's) were fixed in a private contract. Only in the 17th century were several years of travel required for access to mastery, without which the exercise of an independent profession was excluded. The presentation of a masterpiece and passage of an exam were not required in all trades.

Mandatory training was a means of reducing competition. In times of crisis, craftsmanship slowed succession (allowing only one apprentice per workshop, or even halting recruitment totally), made apprenticeship longer and more costly, and made access to mastery more difficult. It favored masters' sons and excluded undesirables without recourse, such as illegitimate children and those whose father practiced a trade considered infamous.

== Rural craftsmanship ==
Outside of peasants' domestic activities, trades linked to banalité (feudal rights), or those organized on a regional scale (stove maker, coppersmith, saddler), there existed hardly any independent craftsmanship in the late medieval countryside. In 15th-century lists of urban journeymen, villagers are nevertheless mentioned, without this implying recognition of rural craftsmanship as a trade body. With population growth in the 16th century, peasants' sons without land began to live from work previously practiced only on an accessory basis. Trades like tailor, shoemaker, and weaver knew affluence, as did construction; then, from 1550 already, blacksmiths, ropemakers, wheelwrights, saddlers, and coopers were found in numerous villages. The recession of the years 1560 to 1580 incited artisans to demand, like their urban colleagues before them, official protective measures against competition. Guild organization seemed imminent.

However, rural guilds existed only in the Bernese, Lucerne, and Solothurn countryside, in southern Aargau, in towns of central Switzerland, and then in eastern Switzerland and the Basel countryside; French-speaking and Italian-speaking Switzerland did not have them. To preserve their urban monopoly, guild cities like Zürich and Schaffhausen prevented village artisans from organizing. The latter had, however, the possibility of adhering to an urban guild. Patrician cantons like Bern or Lucerne, on the contrary, encouraged the creation of rural guilds, which largely adopted the statutes of their urban colleagues.

Despite certain differences, the situation was substantially the same in all countrysides, even in the west and south of the country. There were masters affiliated with guilds imposing on them—on the urban model—norms governing apprenticeship, workshop exploitation, and the struggle against competition; then unorganized but qualified artisans and journeymen possessing their own establishment; and finally semi-qualified or self-taught "trade spoilers." On this point, the countryside fundamentally differed from cities, where only guild members were admitted. Trade spoilers were cottagers employed as day laborers by peasants who assigned them to agricultural as well as artisanal tasks. They were cheap and provided mainly repair work. Subjected to harassment by urban as well as rural masters and exploited by clientele, this under-qualified workforce managed to maintain itself thanks to constant demand. Numerous rural weavers working at home for merchant-manufacturers were also counted among trade spoilers.

It was commonly estimated in the countryside that an artisan, qualified or not, could not live from his artisanal work alone and necessarily needed supplementary activity. He generally possessed a house or part of a house, a garden or field, and enjoyment of commons (wood, pastures, arable land). All lived more or less in self-sufficiency. Authorities imposed lower tariffs and wages on them. This mixed activity with agricultural dominance was also the rule for concessionaires of banal enterprises (like millers, innkeepers, and blacksmiths) who, subject to official tariffs and wages, lived mainly from raw materials trade (grain, wine, iron) and revenues from their domain, which were often considerable.

Forbidden in cities, day work—consisting of serving clientele at home while being meagerly paid by time—was very widespread in the countryside, where the population was in principle hostile to village artisans loyal to their guild. Discontent toward them culminated in the 17th century: the Emmental succeeded in forbidding guilds for a certain time in 1644 and the population of the Zürich countryside succeeded in partially revoking their privileges in the 1650s. Guilds ended up largely tolerating day work. "Bourgeois" trades (pewterer, furrier, parchment maker, goldsmith, painter, sculptor, glazier, glassmaker) managed on the other hand to impose their urban monopoly on the territory of guild and patrician cantons and to block the export of raw materials to the countryside. Anger against the oppression exercised by cities on rural craftsmanship manifested notably in Schaffhausen villages in 1790 and on the shores of Lake Zürich in 1794.

== Gender and craftsmanship ==
While in the rural world the beneficiary of a tenure could be a woman as well as a man, it was quite different in European cities where craftsmanship became a male bastion and strongly misogynistic. At the beginning of the Middle Ages, women still had access to leather, fur, and textile trades, but they were soon excluded. Guilds decreed that only men would be admitted to mastery. In workshops, officially at least, only men worked: master, journeymen, and apprentices. Aside from weavers, only male artisans were trained. Guild law tolerated female work only in the case of the master's death. The widow could, however, direct the workshop only while waiting for her son to come of age to take it over. Thus, her role was limited once again to maintaining male prerogative.

When price and wage tariffing by authority led, from the crisis of the 1690s, to the creeping pauperization of craftsmanship, numerous urban artisans fell back into the middle or lower layers of society. Those of the countryside often found themselves hardly better off than day laborers and trade spoilers. To such a point that in the 18th century, the limitation of enterprises to three or four jobs itself seemed outdated. Even in cities, workshops began to count no more foreign journeymen, without reducing themselves to the sole owner. Guild statutes say not a word about the collaboration of wife and children. Sons and daughters provided the work of an apprentice or journeyman. In "poor" trades, workshops became inexpensive family enterprises, deprived henceforth of the foreign journeymen who had embodied the internationality of craftsmanship.

Under the Ancien Régime, the traveling mood of the late Middle Ages was progressively stifled. The Reformation first frustrated journeymen's free choice of itinerary, then fear of competition made them sedentary. Above all, numerous young people found themselves retained for years in the paternal enterprise to serve as cheap labor until the moment when they would be able to "buy back" their journey to finally open their own workshop. Reduced to employing children, owners even trained their daughters in the trade, without their benefiting from apprentice status, which would have allowed them to exercise independent work at their father's death. Single working women were persecuted by guilds and reduced to begging despite their professional skills. Women had right only to lingerie and weaving; but weavers only tolerated them and excluded them from their organization.

== Urban-rural rivalries ==
Trade regulation required rural artisans to have training equal to that of city dwellers, even though profit possibilities were lesser given market narrowness. This distortion triggered an exodus toward cities from 1550. Cities began to close themselves to immigrants, making citizenship more difficult to obtain before practically excluding it from 1600. This policy responded to city dwellers' demands, who denounced to the council the arrival of new competitors under the pretext that their professions were congested, orders insufficient, and their sons' future threatened. In the late Middle Ages, guilds had extended their suburbs well beyond their city walls and had chased rural artisans from them. At the end of the 16th century, the latter retaliated by establishing themselves in villages relatively close to the city (up to two hours' walk). If it was indeed forbidden for them to go seek orders or introduce manufactured products in urban territory, it was always possible for them to satisfy (at the city rate) "gentlemen and bourgeois" who came to order in their village workshop. This competition was less fierce, even nonexistent, near municipal cities, where the upper classes were more modest.

Despite their monopoly, city artisans ended up suffering in turn from order shortages, falling prices, and growing difficulty getting paid. They had to resign themselves to seeking accessory activities as well; small jobs in municipal administration (porter, night watchman, bailiff, customs officer, gatekeeper) or cultivation of a free plot of land. In the 18th century, common trades like carpenter, ropemaker, roofer, or wheelwright were practically exercised only by needy inhabitants. Economic difficulties would transform in the 18th century the former professional pride of city and country artisans into caste pride occupied with futilities.

The impression of a decline of craftsmanship under the Ancien Régime that these incessant recriminations might give is however false. In the countryside, non-agricultural professions, crafts included, were abundantly represented at the end of the 18th century. Rising, according to regions, to 20–40% of the active population (18% in Zürich Unterland, 37% in Bernese countryside), they had a clear economic importance. Many among them, especially in construction and art craftsmanship, left high-quality works. However, the excess of protective measures largely prevented craftsmanship from modernizing.

== 19th and 20th centuries ==
=== Struggle for freedom of trade and industry ===
On 19 October 1798, the Helvetic Republic proclaimed freedom of trade and industry, thereby suppressing guild constraints. Overnight, all protective measures fell. For the first time, artisans found themselves confronted with unbridled competition. Most did not feel up to assuming this hitherto unknown freedom and had only one desire: to submit again to any institution resembling former guilds. In 1803, Zürich, Basel, Schaffhausen, and Solothurn reintroduced the latter and granted masters the "ordinance" they demanded. On the other hand, freedom of trade and industry managed to maintain itself fully in western and southern Switzerland and almost entirely in other Alemannic cantons. This was the beginning of a long and bitter struggle between proponents of free enterprise and those of trade regulation in the context of the progressive industrialization of Switzerland.

After 1800, cities found themselves facing an unprecedented influx of rural artisans and trade spoilers: urban owners cried out at the "death of craftsmanship." While in the countryside artisans seemed to accommodate rather well to the new situation, their urban counterparts had an ultra-reactionary behavior. In Alemannic cantons rallied to the new system, they multiplied petitions demanding new ordinances and the pure and simple abolition of freedom of trade, industry, and establishment. In this climate of controversy, Lucerne adopted an ordinance providing for new mandatory guilds (1819/1824) and Zürich legislation admitting, alongside free branches, regulated professions (1832). Artisans' demands encountered, however, increasing refusal from authorities and the population. Political upheavals of the 1830s brought down the last guild bastions: Schaffhausen, Basel-Landschaft, Solothurn, and Zürich inscribed in their constitutions freedom of trade and industry; Basel-Stadt followed in 1874. Thus ended urban craftsmanship hegemony. Tensions between city and countryside attenuated. However, several years were needed before artisans could circulate without obstacles from one canton to another; for example, this was possible only in 1858 between Zürich and Schaffhausen.

In German-speaking Switzerland, local arts and crafts associations—generally grouping diverse professions—advocated regulation without guilds, while stubbornly demanding abolition of freedom of trade and establishment, accompanied by protectionist measures. Only after 1870 did the state of mind change. Discussion henceforth bore on the improvement of vocational training. Inscription of freedom of trade and industry in the Constitution of 1874 confirmed this process; the long crisis of the years 1873 to 1895 accelerated it. It finally extended to political organization, apprenticeship reform, and complete reorientation.

As it appeared clearly that industry was supplanting craftsmanship, the latter sought allies and decided to approach step by step retail trade, the hotel industry, the service sector, and some industrial branches. This rapprochement influenced language: while in German, Handwerk (craftsmanship) had been distinguished for three centuries from Gewerbe (trade), the two terms henceforth merged. New policy resulted for several decades in a wave of foundations of local professional associations and mutual aid organizations (purchasing or commercial cooperatives, fiduciary companies, accounting or business consulting services, compensation funds, and health insurance funds). At the same time, artisan training opted for the "dual system," allying practical apprenticeship in an enterprise with theoretical teaching of a vocational school. This system is today completed by introductory courses (mandatory since 1980) and supplementary training leading to mastery or a higher vocational school (federal law of 1997).

Foundation of the Swiss Union of Arts and Crafts (1879) and cantonal unions overseeing local organizations marked decisive stages in this new line. It allowed craftsmanship and small commerce to make themselves heard in political assemblies, on the same basis as workers', employers', or peasants' associations. Hope for a return to mandatory guilds and obstacles to competition was not dead for all that, reviving on occasions of crises or when a profession was threatened. This was the case in the years 1933–1935 with the "corporate order" project and in 1954 with the call from shoemakers, hairdressers, saddlers, and wheelwrights demanding State protection in the form of a mandatory certificate of capacity. These two attempts were rejected by the people.

Freedom of trade and industry thus did not go without saying for Swiss craftsmanship, which had been inspired for centuries by Empire usages and regulations and which departed from this model only in the 19th century. While in Germany artisanal organizations succeeded in obtaining step by step a restoration of guilds and obstacles to competition, Swiss craftsmanship remained deregulated, without protection against competition, without constraining organization, without mastery obligation or limitation of activity domains.

=== Industrialization and structural changes ===
Competition between urban and rural owners, qualified artisans, and trade spoilers continued to rage after 1800, while manufactures, dispersed textile industry, and first factories—oriented toward distant markets—did not yet represent any real threat. Only from the 1820s did the revolutionary effects of the new production system begin to manifest themselves. The machine allowed much superior productivity, price reduction, and faster adaptation to fashions. Unlike the artisan, condemned to slowly produce pieces in limited numbers, the factory alone was able to satisfy the massive demand of a rapidly growing population. Industry stripped craftsmanship of a growing number of articles that had been reserved for it until then. After 1850, the economic importance of the latter decreased in inverse proportion to industrial development. Technical progress rendered certain trades useless: porcelain manufactured in series replaced pewter dishes and metal cables replaced ropemakers' cords. In the second half of the 19th century, retail trade and its efficient distribution system spread rapidly in the countryside as in the city. The increasingly diversified offer in glassware, hardware, earthenware, pottery, bedding, stationery, shoes, and ready-to-wear clothing from department stores resulted for artisans in decreased orders and unemployment. At the same time as their turnover, their share in the total population diminished (10.7% in 1888, 8.4% in 1920).

During the crisis of 1873, craftsmanship suffered such a shortage of orders that its disappearance seemed inevitable. But the expansion phase that followed around 1895 finally permitted structural conversion of craftsmanship. Trades disappeared (soap maker, comb maker, nailer, brewer), were absorbed by industry, or were reduced to repairs (shoemaker, watchmaker). On the other hand, new artisanal professions appeared, especially in industry and services: coachbuilder, electrician, fitter, garage owner, bicycle mechanic, installer, radio electrician, photographer, druggist, etc.

Construction and the hotel industry became branches of primary importance. Enterprise size increased only slowly: at the beginning of the 20th century, the small enterprise (1 to 9 people) still dominated arts and crafts; it represented 95% of establishments (of which half reduced to the sole owner), but employed only 47% of workforce (1905). Until 1929, the number of the former would diminish while the percentage of the latter increased, so that average enterprise size passed from four people in 1905 to six in 1929, at the expense of small individual operations and retail trade. During the great crisis of the 1930s, the movement experienced a truce. Mechanization accelerated on the other hand: in 1905, 11% of enterprises used motors (electric or not), a proportion that would rise to 59% in 1939 already.

The high economic climate after 1950 gave unexpected impetus to arts and crafts. Artisanal professions opened to women. Various changes affected enterprise size and their mechanization; hence the well-known passage from the system of artisanal exploitation and retail trade to that of industrial production and large-scale distribution. As the term Gewerbe has no precise definition in Switzerland and statistics make no distinction between artisanal and industrial enterprises, one must stick to broad lines of evolution. After 1950, average establishment size, not counting passing fluctuations occurring in the 1970s and 1990s decades, was in a growth phase (7 people in 1955, 9.5 in 1965, 9 in 1975, 11 in 1985, 8 in 1991, 10 in 1995). The share of small operations diminished between 1955 and 1995 ("death of small commerce," etc.), while the number of individual enterprises began again to grow thanks to a trend reversal. Similarly, a reduction in the number of men and women employed in small establishments is noted, followed however by a new increase from the 1970s decade. As artisanal trades are today divided among arts and crafts, industry, and services, they also participate in the general decline of the secondary sector to the benefit of the tertiary.

From 1950 at the latest, craftsmanship ceased to enjoy a separate existence in Switzerland. As for industry and services, the successful economic performance of each enterprise depends on permanent structural transformation and rapid adaptation to technical progress.

== Leather crafts ==
The leather industry comprised, besides the shoe industry, saddlery and leather goods, branches manufacturing utilitarian articles. While saddlery was for a long time an artisanal trade, industrial leather goods manufacturing reached a certain importance in Switzerland only after 1930. Saddlery evolution was closely linked to that of tanning. Until 1930, tanneries produced mainly coarse leathers, worked by saddlers who made objects for technical use, often destined for the army. After 1930, they also launched into fine leather manufacturing. They often themselves manufactured articles such as transmission belts or joints. Artisanal saddleries were specialized in saddle and bridle manufacturing and supplied equipment material to the army and police. With transport motorization, this traditional sector lost importance as demand diminished strongly. Many saddlers henceforth contented themselves with performing repairs, others worked as upholsterers for the automobile industry or furniture factories. Thus was born the new profession of saddler-upholsterer.

The largest clients of saddlers were the Confederation, cantons, and communes, particularly the post office, railways, army, and police, hence the strong concentration of the branch in the canton of Bern. By equipping the Swiss army, saddlers could benefit from protectionist measures, such as reduced prices on imported leathers, hides, and shoes, thanks to the compensation fund. After 1960, army orders for leather articles experienced a sharp decline. Many small family enterprises (often an owner working alone) thus lost what ensured their existence. Today, saddlery has hardly any importance in Switzerland.

Leather goods produced notably handbags and travel articles. Until the dawn of the 20th century, manufacturing centers of Offenbach am Main, Stuttgart, and Vienna also supplied the Swiss market. The first Swiss-manufactured leather goods were watch straps. Thanks to tourism development, the 1920s and 1930s saw the birth of enterprises specialized in travel article production. Cheap raw materials, protectionist measures, and the idea of achieving self-sufficiency allowed this young industry to compete with foreign production. Large-sized enterprises appeared, employing essentially female labor. Since 1970, however, the branch has experienced regular decline.

In 1899, master saddlers and upholsterers founded an organization primarily concerned with customs matters. In 1914, leather industrialists established the Swiss Association of Manufacturers of Travel Goods and Leather Articles. (Note: German: Unternehmer der Lederwarenindustrie den Verband des Schweizerischen Reiseartikel- und Ledergewerbes; French: Association suisse des fabricants d'articles de voyage et de maroquinerie; Italian: Ass. sviz. dei fabbricanti di articoli da viaggio e di pelletteria) The most important trade union representing leather workers was the Swiss Clothing, Leather and Equipment Workers' Union (VBLA), (Note: German: Verband der Bekleidungs-, Leder- und Ausrüstungsarbeiter (VBLA; French: Fédération habillement et cuir, VBLA; Italian: Federazione sviz. degli operai dell'abbigliamento, del cuoio e dell'arredamento) founded in 1930. Despite a low level of unionization, the federation succeeded in securing the first collective labor agreement for leather workers in 1954. In 1992, it was incorporated into the Union of Industry, Construction and Services.

== Textiles ==
=== Production ===
Textile production was carried out by artisans organized in guilds and working on commission, as well as by peasant households that commonly engaged in spinning and even weaving. Every peasant household possessed a spinning wheel, an inexpensive object that became the attribute of the poor. Each region had its characteristic form: the vertical spinning wheel was widespread in the cantons of Bern, Lucerne, Neuchâtel, and Valais, while the larger horizontal spinning wheel predominated in Grisons and Ticino. The spindle, consisting of a 20-25 cm wooden rod weighted at its lower end with a disc or whorl, preceded the spinning wheel and dominated in Eastern Switzerland until the 18th century. Raw materials were suspended from a distaff, a stick placed next to the spinner, attached to her belt, or fixed to her wheel.

Weaving played an economic role of primary importance from an early date. The treadle loom, operated by the feet, reportedly replaced the old vertical loom in the late Middle Ages. Peasant inventories often mention hand looms. Farm production of linen fabric covered household needs and could be subject to levies (numerous attestations from the Middle Ages onward). However, the necessary equipment was more costly than the spinning wheel and therefore less widespread, except among large farmers and professional weavers. Flax, an indigenous fiber, was worked everywhere; wool and silk, by contrast, were woven only in cities. Drapery flourished in Fribourg in the 15th century, one of the few places where it became an export sector; linen cloth in Eastern Switzerland from the 15th to 17th centuries and in the Bern-Lucerne region from the 17th to 20th centuries; silk weaving in Zurich from the 17th to 20th centuries; cotton weaving in Eastern Switzerland from the 18th to 20th centuries (in Zurich from the late 16th century).

Twisting consisted of assembling two or more simple threads to obtain a stronger one, subsequently used for sewing, weaving, or embroidering. This specifically urban activity, known since the Middle Ages, played a role in the export economy from the 16th century. In Geneva, Zurich, and Basel, silk was twisted from the 16th to 18th centuries using mechanisms driven by human or hydraulic energy. In the 19th century, cotton for embroidery was primarily treated this way. Industrial twisting reached its peak after 1850 due to strong demand for embroidery and sewing threads from mechanical embroidery.

=== Dyeing ===
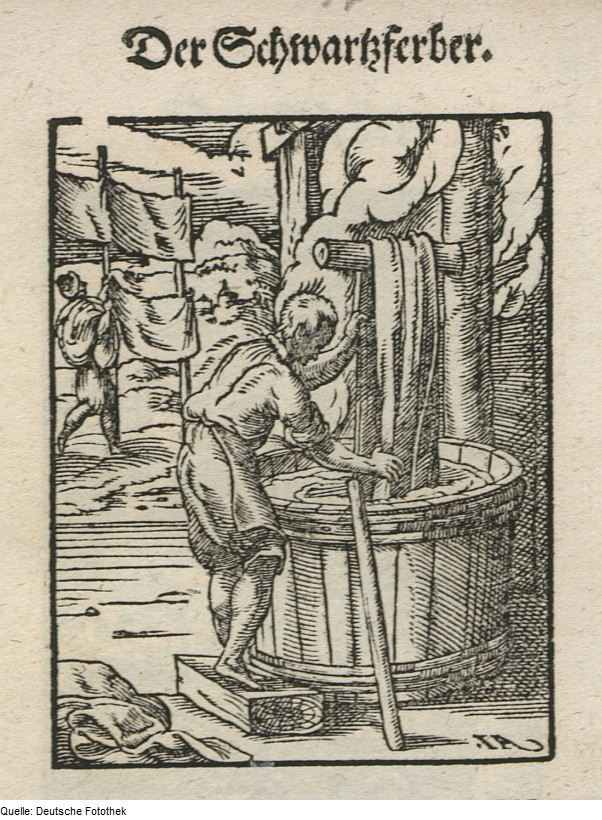
The dyer. Woodcut from Jost Ammann's “Book of Trades” (Das Ständebuch, 1568) (Swiss National Library, Bern).

Until around 1800, dye works were concession-subject enterprises, and thus protected. Dyeing and bleaching (which are aspects of finishing or ennobling) were linked to textile industry evolution: its rise in the 19th century brought them out of the artisanal era; its decline in the last decades of the 20th century put them in crisis.

Dyeing has been known since Antiquity. Certain fibers reacted directly to dyes, others had to undergo preliminary chemical treatment on the surface or in depth (mordanting); numerous colors were obtained only by overdyeing. Different techniques existed, which required much know-how and were documented from the Middle Ages. In textile centers, specialized trades appeared: small-dye dyers (black), large-dye dyers (bright colors), silk dyers. Before the discovery of synthetic dyes (from 1856), only substances of plant and animal origin were available, generally imported: madder and cochineal (red), woad (blue), saffron and safflower (yellow), gall nuts (black); from the 15th century, overseas trade procured new substances (brazilwood, logwood) and made others more accessible (indigo). As mordants, ash and lime-based lyes, alum, and urine were used.

Dye works were linked to textile craftsmanship, of which they were often only dependencies. In Switzerland, there were some in each city or town, but they remained small, except in textile centers like Fribourg (cloth), St. Gallen and Wil (canvas) in the late Middle Ages, Lugano (cloth), Geneva and Zürich (silk) from the 16th or 17th century. Beside independent licensed dyers, who treated indigenous or imported goods at the request of weavers or merchants, were found weavers, cloth shearers, even merchants who exploited a dye works on an accessory basis, either themselves or by hiring workers.

Dyers, belatedly organized, had no guild in their name, but formed influential masterships (subgroups within a guild). In Basel, the Weavers' guild tried in vain, in 1599, to force them to join it: they kept free choice among the four textile guilds (two of merchants, two of artisans). In Zürich, they were considered to practice a free trade (1674) and all guilds, even the Konstaffel, were open to them. In St. Gallen and Lucerne, they were part of the Tailors' guild. The profession regulated apprenticeship and journeymanship but did not impose masterpiece presentation.

After 1800, dyeing—sometimes linked to fabric printing—experienced very vigorous growth, driven by that of the Swiss textile industry, especially in the cantons of Glarus (of which it became with calico printing the main industry), Zürich, and Thurgau. Certain workshops became veritable factories.

After 1850, new methods revolutionized finishing: mercerization of cotton, silk loading, permanent sizing, artificial fiber sizing, but above all synthetic dyes and rapid chemical bleaching, which gave better results in less time. With mechanization, dyeing and bleaching transformed into the textile ennobling industry, comprising independent establishments working to order and others attached to a textile factory or a factory active in straw plaiting. As consumption industries, both were very sensitive to economic conditions and directly exposed to enormous fluctuations of the textile sector. 178 enterprises and 14,476 workers were counted in 1929; 101 and 7,854 in 1939; 89 and 10,216 in 1955; 157 and 2,738 in 1995; 109 and 1,680 in 2001.

A displacement of activity centers is also observed: between the 18th and 19th centuries, the dominant role passed from Romandy (Geneva and Neuchâtel) to eastern Switzerland (Glarus and Zürich) in dyeing and calico printing, and from St. Gallen to Appenzell Ausserrhoden in cotton bleaching. Since 1900, ennobling has been concentrated in northeastern Switzerland. Various associations devoted themselves to defense of crisis-sensitive activities. Most among them merged in 1941 into the Federation of Swiss Textile Ennobling Industry, which joined in 1991 the Swiss Textile Federation. The professional group of textile ennobblers comprises dyers and finishers (bleachers, finishers, impregnators, pleaters), but also textile cleaners (laundry, dry cleaning).

=== Silk ===
Known for centuries in China, India, and Japan, silk appeared in Europe between the 10th and 13th centuries. In Switzerland, silk production was introduced in the 16th century, remaining for a long time one of the most important industrial activities. However, for climatic reasons, silkworm breeding was always marginal, except in Ticino where it was important for rural economy between the 17th and 19th centuries.

In Geneva, Italian and French merchant-manufacturers—sometimes grouped in companies endowed with important capital—produced from the mid-16th century threads destined for local artisans and export (spinning and dyeing of weft, organzine and floss from waste), as well as velvets, taffetas, and trimmings sold in European fairs. Working under the putting-out system (dispersed industry), they ordered from master-artisans directing a small family workshop, always located in the city. Masterships (guilds) supervised artisan training, raw material and product quality, and techniques used, sometimes refusing to adopt innovations demanded by merchants. After the Revocation of the Edict of Nantes (1685), Huguenots from Languedoc developed in the city the knitting of silk stockings on looms. This era saw the abandonment of wide fabric weaving practiced for a century, while passementerie diversified by integrating the use of precious metals.

At its beginnings in the 16th century, Basel's silk industry resembled that of Geneva; Italian, French, and Flemish refugee merchants created establishments grouping silk thread preparation and velvet and ribbon weaving. But in the 17th century, guild regulation severity pushed city merchants to have a large part of their ribbons woven at home in villages of the Basel countryside and the bishopric of Basel, even Solothurn and Bernese territories. Adoption around 1667 of the bar loom (with 14 or 16 shuttles), brought back from Holland by entrepreneur Emanuel Hoffmann, sealed the fate of Basel ribbon-making. Entrepreneurs henceforth manufactured in the countryside, on these large looms (with 54 ribbons in 1900), taffeta and floss ribbons soon exported worldwide. City passementiers kept the monopoly of ornate products, which were more expensive and manufactured on narrow high-warp looms for local and regional markets.

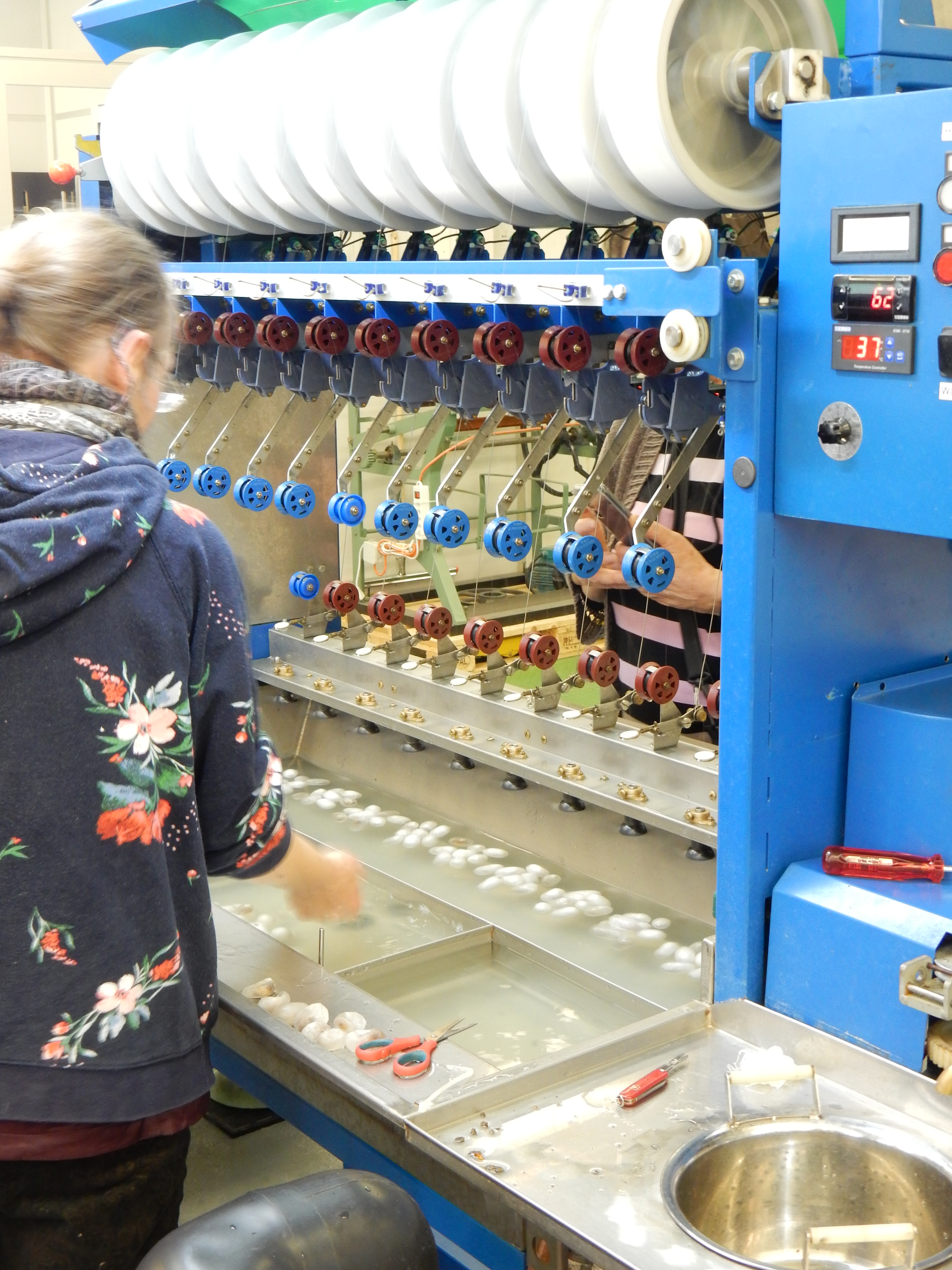
Silk manufacturing in Bolligen, Switzerland

After a brief episode of silk veil and ribbon weaving in the 13th century, Zürich sheltered from 1555 a refugee colony arriving from Locarno. Sometimes welcomed with reticence, these silk workers were soon relayed by native merchants who, thanks to their cotton experience, were able to create houses devoted to silk and wool thread production. The city thus supplied its local artisans, while imposing itself as a redistribution center for imported raw silks from Spain and Italy, then re-exported in yarn form to Basel, France, Austria, Germany, and England. In the 18th century, due to cotton competition, Zürichers had to widen the area in which they recruited their workforce: from Ticino to Aargau, in central Swiss mountains, in Lucerne and Gersau, silk was carded and spun—manually or on hydraulic mills—in small rural family workshops.

Thanks to the absence of laws regulating work time and wages, skillful family alliances, and a continuous effort to adapt to fashion and technical evolution, the Swiss silk industry experienced remarkable 19th-century growth (13.79 million meters in 1855, 27.55 in 1881, and 47.07 in 1900). This growth was certainly interrupted by the depression of the 1870s and 1880s, which nevertheless did not prevent an important increase of weaving enterprises and their workforce. It was concentrated in Zürich (weaving) and Basel (ribbon-making), but also in several eastern Swiss regions (Appenzell Ausserrhoden, Glarus, St. Gallen) struck by unemployment caused by cotton work mechanization. In Ticino, it experienced its apogee in the 19th century, but declined from the century's end.

The luxury industry, especially that turned toward export, was particularly affected by 20th-century wars and economic crises. Entirely mechanized since 1855, spinning survived only thanks to concentrations and the creation of foreign subsidiaries where labor was cheaper. Ribbon-making was struck by fashion evolution and the collapse of American and English demand; after culminating in the two Basels at nearly 12,000 in 1888 and 1910, jobs strongly diminished in the 1920s, causing misery in a vulnerable and poorly protected population. The crisis of the 1930s and the Second World War precipitated its disappearance at the end of the 20th century.

=== Textile arts ===
Textile arts include any original artistic creation using weaving techniques. In Switzerland, textile arts, which are part of the decorative arts, have experienced uninterrupted development since the Middle Ages. In the late Middle Ages, town burghers strengthened by craftsmanship and commerce adorned their houses with hangings, covers, cushions, and tablecloths. Movable at will and created on commission in a single copy, these art objects then had a function comparable to that which easel painting would later have. Churches and convents received as gifts altar cloths and choir hangings whose saints' effigies and religious scenes referred to particular feasts of the liturgical calendar and were displayed only on these occasions.

The oldest known example of a wall hanging in Switzerland is the "Sion tapestry" dating from the second half of the 14th century, of which the Swiss National Museum in Zürich, the Basel Historical Museum, and the Bern History Museum possess fragments. From the same period, sources attest that tapestries were produced in Basel. Tapestry is a technique consisting of interlacing colored weft threads with a warp to obtain figurative images and abstract motifs. It seems that the city of Basel was in the Middle Ages the only tapestry center in Switzerland. The oldest preserved pieces of the Basel school, which would develop a quite characteristic style and reach its apogee in the 15th century, date from the years 1410–1420. Of elongated format, they show elegant gentlemen taming fabulous animals and served to adorn and color the low, dark rooms—where furniture was rare—of late Gothic style bourgeois houses (Basel Historical Museum).

From the beginning of the 16th century, the role held until then by tapestry makers fell to embroidery workshops. Needle paintings executed using multicolored wools, highlighted with silk, gold, or silver threads, showed scenes from the Old and New Testament, as well as from daily life. Motifs drawn in pencil were transferred using a brush or pen onto a canvas background. Gros point embroidery entirely covered the fabric. Often, a family coat of arms occupied the composition's center, proof that works executed by burghers' wives or daughters were not destined solely for dwelling enjoyment, but also proclaimed family pride.

Attested in Switzerland since the first half of the 13th century by a 6.7 m long tablecloth preserved at the National Museum, linen embroidery was practiced in Zürich, Schaffhausen, and St. Gallen between the mid-16th and beginning of the 17th century. As a canvas production center in the Lake Constance region, St. Gallen supplied the basic material for these works representing, besides Bible passages, episodes from Swiss history. Embroidery thread consisted at first only of bleached linen fibers. Added to this from the 16th century were blue and brown yarns, colored silks, and gold and silver threads.

At the beginning of the 17th century, liturgical reform promulgated by the Council of Trent led to a renewal of sacred vestments and ornaments: adapted to henceforth prescribed colors, they were made in silk fabrics adorned with precious embroideries. Nuns of various central Swiss convents specialized in making these new vestments. Sophie Taeuber-Arp, who directed from 1916 to 1929 the textile class of the Zürich school of arts and crafts, exercised determining influence on contemporary textile arts. She managed to make her embroidered paintings autonomous works of art. After her, textile techniques and forms became means of pure expression. Thanks to the work and teaching of Elsi Giauque, Sophie Taeuber's student, textile arts freed themselves from traditional technical constraints. In the 1960s began the conquest of the third dimension, illustrated by veritable textile sculptures. The role played by the Tapestry Biennial founded in Lausanne in 1962 under Jean Lurçat's impetus cannot be sufficiently emphasized. Thanks to it, Switzerland hosts an international forum that regularly informs on the most advanced trends in contemporary textile arts.

== Clothing ==
All medieval Swiss cities housed tailoring workshops, around which other crafts gravitated according to fashion trends. Furriery held an important position until the 16th century due to the medieval preference for fur. Hat-making developed in the 15th and 16th centuries with the production of high felt hats, including the famous conical Basel hat, followed by the manufacture of round, square, and multicolored caps that became black when adopted as functional attributes by clergy, judges, and professors. Wigmakers and hatters influenced fashion in the 17th and 18th centuries by preparing hairstyles, tricornes, and bicornes.

In the 13th and 14th centuries, furriers, tailors, and shoemakers—sometimes united with tanners—created their guilds in Alemannic-speaking cities (later also in Western and Southern Switzerland), the first being the Basel furriers' guild in 1226. Journeyman societies emerged in the 15th and 16th centuries, parallel to master associations. Later, clothing craftsmen and subcontractors joined existing guilds, integrating according to the city into those of tailors, weavers, or mercers. The rule was not to manufacture clothes in series but made-to-measure in craftsmen's workshops. In the 17th and 18th centuries, tailoring and shoemaking were trades of the poor, partly practiced by Hintersassen (inhabitants without citizenship rights). Masters were assisted by their wives and children, but except in lingerie, women were not allowed to practice an autonomous trade.

Demographic growth in the 16th century favored the opening of tailoring and shoemaking workshops in rural areas to meet the population's basic needs. These trades formed guilds on the urban model in the Bernese, Lucerne, Solothurn, and Basel countryside, in southern Aargau, in Central Switzerland, and later in Eastern Switzerland. Labor was more abundant in rural areas than in cities because non-professional day work for low pay was authorized there. Clothing constituted a large part of rural crafts (for example, 30 to 40% in the Zurich Unterland). Under the Ancien Régime, knitting and straw plaiting provided income to the poor. In the 17th and 18th centuries, entire families knitted breeches, stockings, bonnets, or gloves, plaited straw, sewed and trimmed hats, activities often associated with agricultural day labor.

=== Shoemaking ===
Shoemakers constituted a traditional craft of major importance. In the early modern period and until around 1900, they often played a leading role in uprisings and revolutionary movements. Until the mid-19th century, shoe manufacturing in Switzerland was a corporately organized craft. Domestic production covered most demand, supplemented by sales from German and French traveling merchants. The necessary equipment for shoemaking was more costly than simple textile tools, limiting the craft primarily to professional artisans rather than peasant households engaged in supplementary work.

Shoemakers were often united with tanners in the same guilds, reflecting the close connection between leather production and footwear manufacturing. These craftsmen worked primarily with leather produced by local tanners, though some imported materials were also used. The craft required specialized skills in cutting, stitching, and shaping leather to fit individual customers' feet. Like other clothing crafts, shoemaking was performed on a made-to-measure basis, with each pair of shoes custom-fitted to the wearer. The trade provided employment in both urban and rural areas, though rural shoemakers, like rural tailors, were often among the poorer segments of society and combined their craft with agricultural day labor.

== Decorative arts ==
Born around 1860, the concept of decorative arts (or applied arts) designates the ensemble of everyday objects where essentially artistic aspects prevail. Function, form, and material tend uniformly toward the constitution of a beautiful object, sometimes unique, as an expression of the firm will of an art craftsmanship in reaction to 19th-century industrial culture. Decorative art objects respond to three constraints: form, execution, and ornamentation, while satisfying laws of function and ensemble; through ornamentation is thus outlined a life of style, a reflection of the aesthetic preoccupations of the public to which the object addresses itself and the normative rules of good taste that one gradually seeks to establish with a view to quality industrial production.

The 18th century is characterized by the rapid advance of French taste in the west of the country and the permanence of Renaissance and baroque styles in the Germanic part. Furniture and decoration objects then very often reflected the political, social, or economic situation of urban communities. Cities where guilds (Zürich), patriciate (Bern), or merchants (Basel or Geneva) dominated thus determined clientele with proper tastes, which favored through its orders a particular style. Masters to whom these orders were entrusted in turn exercised lasting influence on nearby workshops and sometimes exported their production beyond borders, such as for example the Funk cabinetmakers of Bern.

Initiated at the Renaissance, the progressive dissolution of artistic guilds had as a consequence to confine for a time decorative arts in the field of minor artistic activities. It was necessary to wait for industrial design's advent to see condemned the theoretical exclusion that then separated decorative arts and fine arts. With romanticism, curiosity for the past invested the decorative arts domain: fashion was then for eclectic historicism before melting, toward the end of the 19th century, into a multitude of styles that were wished national. Numerous universal exhibitions of the century's second half magnified various mechanization processes supposed to reconcile craftsmanship and industry and, by encouraging research on past techniques, pushed toward the formation of national schools (Thun majolica, for example). The 19th century, on the other hand, saw the formation of decorative art museums, in which products of human ingenuity at various eras were exhibited, then, around these, art schools surging (for example the Winterthur school of arts and crafts, 1874).

Gottfried Semper's lessons at the Zurich Polytechnic (1855–1870) however served decorative arts reform by calling for the perfection of industrial production. From the turn of the century, various tendencies then exercised definitive action that abolished frontiers between decorative arts and fine arts. Thus French Art Nouveau, Vienna Secession, and the English Arts and Crafts movement were well received and led to the foundation in 1913 of the Schweizerischer Werkbund, or L'Œuvre in Romandy, then to functionalist opening. If one can still glimpse, in the Heimatwerk (born in 1930), nationalist temptations appeared during the Second World War with the Swiss National Style (Heimatstil), new paths of creation are open, despite rumors of a decorative arts crisis.

== Glassmaking ==
Glass is a brittle material produced by fusion of various substances (siliceous sand, ash, lime). From it are made plates and receptacles, decorative objects, tubes, bulbs, lamps, jewels, insulators, eyeglasses, mirrors. Special glasses exist for chemistry, medicine, optics, electronics, household, and construction.

=== Earliest remains found in Switzerland ===
The beginnings of glass production on present-day Swiss territory are obscure. Archaeological discoveries attest to the use of this material but give no indication of its manufacture location. It was imported in bar form or as finished products. Numerous remains (Celtic bracelets from the 3rd century BC) discovered in Bern and Basel suggest that local production existed. Only in the Roman era, after the discovery of glassblowing, were transparent and monochrome receptacles and for the first time window glass produced in Switzerland in fairly large quantities, besides jewels. Several glassworks have been uncovered at Roman-era sites. At Aventicum, one of the glass production centers in Helvetia, a large part of the glassworks infrastructure was preserved, with four furnaces and an annealing furnace. Glass bars, manufacturing waste, and high-quality receptacles testify to the technique used and diversity of forms in the mid-1st century. Other Roman glass centers with furnaces and manufacturing waste were discovered at Augusta Raurica. From the 1st to 3rd centuries, these workshops manufactured hollow glass, but also window glass. Roman glassworks situated on present-day Swiss territory did not use local raw materials but imported glass paste and melted old glass which they transformed into finished products.

=== Manufacturing and use from the Middle Ages ===
Hardly any traces of high Middle Ages glasswork workshops remain on present-day Swiss territory, but glass objects from this era are quite numerous (receptacles and colored beads discovered in tombs and habitats). They came for the most part from workshops of northern Italy or the Frankish kingdom and were reserved for the elite. Imports diminished markedly in the 7th century.

The first documented local glassmakers, such as Stracholfas at St. Gallen (9th century), worked in abbeys; these remained for a long time the only production centers, manufacturing essentially flat glass for their own needs. Hollow glass was probably imported. From the 10th century, colored flat glass production gained importance (until the 13th century). The first stained glass windows and the treatise Schedula diversarum artium written in 1100 by monk or priest Theophilus (Roger of Helmarshausen, goldsmith) constitute important sources on medieval glassworks technique.

Glassworks required a sufficient reserve of wood, water, and sand. They were therefore installed at the edge of a river or stream, in full forest (and had to be moved if the site came to be deforested). Glassworks are attested in the Black Forest from the mid-13th century. They probably delivered glass as far as northwestern Swiss cities. Finer and more expensive products were imported from Murano near Venice. Glass production became local craftsmanship at latest from the 14th century. In the 15th century appeared throughout Europe forest glassworks that produced in large quantity glass for daily use at affordable prices and shipped it to cities. Until the 18th century, they remained the principal supplier of common glass. Their geographical remoteness constrained them to organize an entire distribution system (transporters, glass merchants). They are rarely mentioned in official documents, but their memory sometimes subsists in place names (La Verrière near Berolle, La Heutte, Vordere and Hintere Glashütte in Boowald near St. Urban, Glasbach). Medieval glassworks were located in the canton of Bern, at Guggisberg (1347–1400) and at Röthenbach im Emmental (mentioned around 1400). Several workshops were situated in the Bernese and Solothurn Jura, such as those of La Heutte (mentioned in 1370) and Klus (1423–1581). In central Switzerland, presence of a factory between Schüpfheim and Flühli is documented in 1433.

=== From craftsmanship to industry ===
In Bernese and Solothurn Jura glassworks, production continued in modern times without interruption. At the apogee of Venetian glass (16th–17th centuries), indigenous workshops tried to copy precious glasses "in Venetian fashion," relying partly on immigrant glassblowers who brought Murano techniques.

Klus glassworks was progressively replaced by that of Gänsbrunnen (mentioned around 1562). La Heutte (from 1594) and Le Chaluet (from 1657) each counted four workshops; other factories were located in Rüschgraben (Oberdorf SO, mentioned in 1633), at Court and at Lobschez (near Soubey, mentioned in 1659). Ten other glassworks were created in the 18th and 19th centuries. At Klus were also active entrepreneurs originating from the Empire and Lorraine. Starting from Gänsbrunnen, the Robichon and Schmid families constituted, beside the Hug, veritable glassmaker dynasties. They played an important role as glassworks founders and glass technicians also in the Black Forest (from 1600), Sundgau and Alsace (from 1645), Franche-Comté (from 1660), then in the rest of France. Glassmakers from Bohemia are attested around 1580 already at Gänsbrunnen; they then appear as glassworks concessionaires at La Heutte (1594 and 1599) and in Entlebuch (1608).

In 1723, the Siegwart brothers, from St. Blaise (Black Forest), built a glassworks at Südel, between Flühli and Sörenberg in Entlebuch, thus laying the first stone of an important Swiss enterprise that would be exploited over several generations (closed around 1870). Some members of this family settled in southern Switzerland. Meinrad Siegwart took over in 1775 the Personico glassworks (mentioned in 1736). From the mid-18th century, new growth permitted the creation of numerous factories, notably at Schangnau, Semsales, and Lodrino, where a branch of the family directed a workshop from 1782.

With industrialization and the use of coal as fuel, glassworks installed themselves along the railway network or navigable routes. The train brought coal and took away finished products. Glassworks situated in distant forests then lost their profitability. In 1817, the Siegwart brothers opened a factory at Hergiswil (NW). Subsequently, factories of Monthey (1822), Küssnacht (SZ, 1851), Wauwil (1879), Bülach (1890), Saint-Prex (1911), and Altstetten (1914), specialized in hollow glass, were created near railway lines. Moutier glassworks, the sole producer of window glass, opened its doors in 1840. Until the 19th century, Entlebuch produced, besides bottles and window panes, 95% of Swiss green-colored glass.

The first semi-automatic blowing machine for bottles entered service in 1859. In 1870, the pot furnace system (gas-fired) succeeded crucible furnaces. Machine workers replaced former artisans, and productivity doubled. In 1900, Hergiswil and Küssnacht glassworks merged to form Schweizerische Glasindustrie Siegwart & Co. AG. Second industrialization stimulated demand for glass products for the chemical industry. Between the 18th and end of 19th centuries, the number of glassworks reduced from 18 to five due to wood shortage, poor sand quality, and international competition.

The first electric furnace was installed at Romont (FR) in 1935. This system experienced international success. In the mid-20th century, the five hollow glass factories (Saint-Prex, Wauwil, Bülach, Küssnacht, and Hergiswil) employed about 1,500 people. Annual production amounted to about 25,000 tons. Simultaneously, Switzerland imported 6,000 tons of hollow glass per year. With Moutier and Romont glassworks, enterprises mentioned above were part of the Swiss Glassworks Group, created in 1931. In 1966, Saint-Prex, Wauwil, and Bülach factories created the Vetropack firm. Sole producer of packaging glass in Switzerland, it participates, with its subsidiaries in Eastern and Western Europe, in international glass trade and ranks among Europe's largest packaging glass manufacturers with a turnover of 589.4 million francs (2011). In 2011, 94% of glass destined for packaging could be recycled. Since 1992, the Glasi Hergiswil museum (taken over in 1976 by Roberto Niederer) is devoted to glass history.

=== Stained glass ===
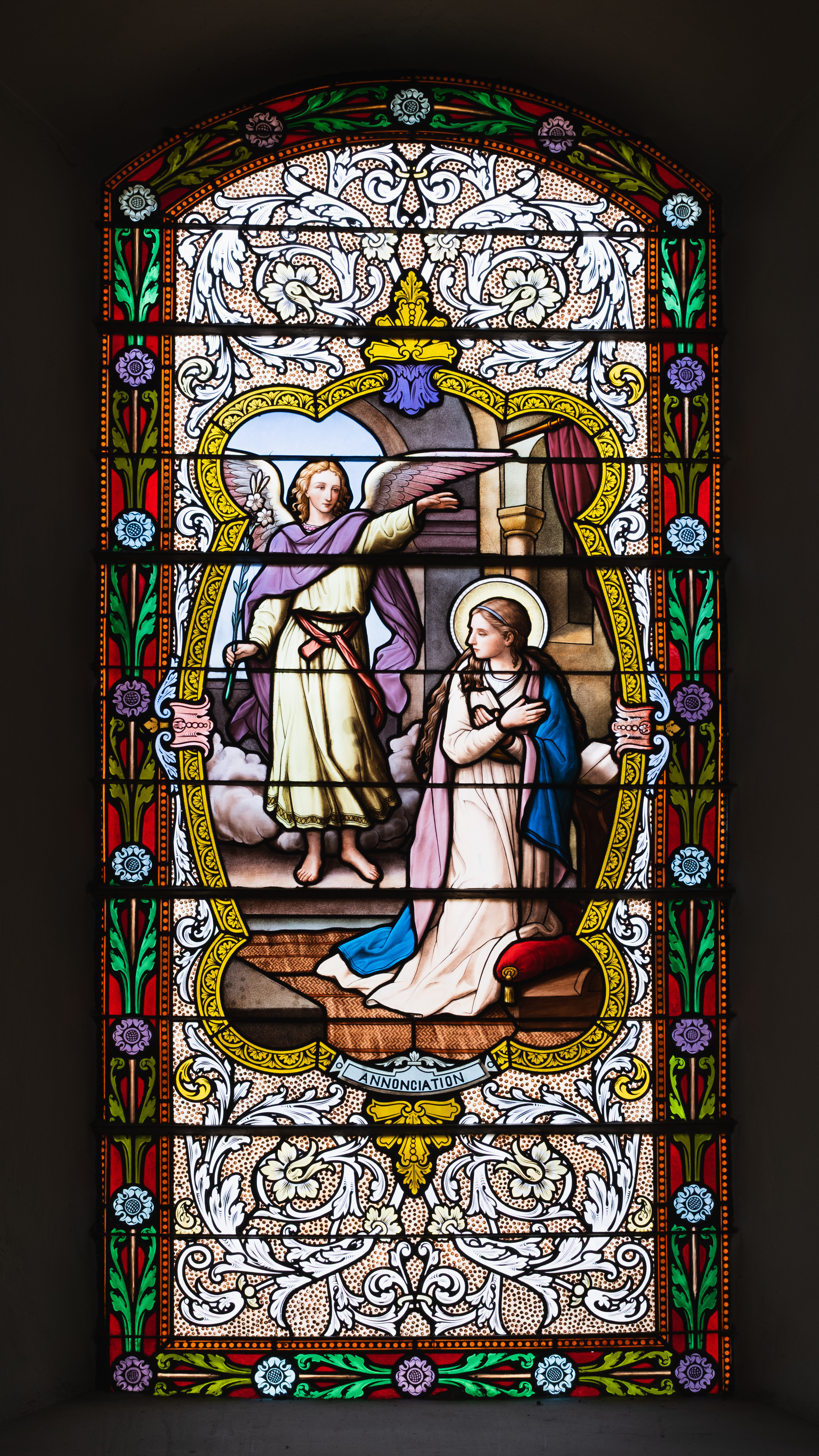
Stained glass window in the Church of Saint Euphemia in Vissoie, Switzerland

A stained glass window is a bay closure constituted of pieces of glass tinted in the mass, assembled so as to obtain a figurative or ornamental composition. During fabrication, each piece of glass is painted with a brown-black color more or less diluted, grisaille, before being fired in the oven and set in a network of leads. Toward the end of the 13th century, it was discovered that silver gave glass, when fired, a yellow tint; this new coloration process spread on Swiss territory in the first half of the 14th century. The technique of enamel painting on white glass, developed in the 15th century, was much used in Swiss stained glass between the 16th and 18th centuries, and again after 1820.

In the Middle Ages, stained glass painters had to procure their materials in local markets. For present-day Swiss territory, it must have been mainly the Black Forest, Vosges, and Lorraine. Today, glass comes principally from Waldsassen (Bavaria) and Saint-Just (Rhône-Alpes). As an artistic genre, stained glass manufacturing could support one or more workshops in the same place only in the presence of strong demand, which is why stained glass painters were organized in specialized guilds only in large centers. Generally, they adhered to a guild grouping various art trades or open to all trades, like that of the Sky in Basel or the Mittellöwen Society in Bern.

The oldest witnesses of stained glass art in Switzerland date back to the Carolingian era. However, until around 1200, these are only fragments uncovered by archaeology (Müstair, 9th century; Payerne, 12th century). The oldest fully preserved stained glass dates from the early 13th century. The Flums Virgin (around 1200, today at the National Museum) still largely relates to Romanesque style, while the rose of Lausanne cathedral (from the same period) is an example of French antiquating style. The first tendencies of high Gothic can be observed in stained glass from the cloister of Wettingen Cistercian abbey (around 1280) and the choir of the Hospitallers' church of St. John in Münchenbuchsee (around 1290). French Gothic style established itself on Swiss territory around 1300. A series of important ensembles then appeared: Kappel am Albis (around 1300/1310), Königsfelden (nave around 1316, choir between 1330 and 1340 approximately, aisles around 1360), Frauenfeld-Oberkirch (1325–1330), Blumenstein (around 1330), Köniz (around 1330), and Hauterive (1330–1340). The most important ensemble of late Gothic stained glass in Switzerland adorns the choir of Bern Minster (from 1441 to around 1455).

After the Reformation, preference went toward brighter interior spaces and monumental stained glass art largely disappeared in Switzerland. On the other hand, isolated small-format panels experienced success from the end of the 15th century, perpetuated by the tradition of armorial stained glass donations until the early 18th century. In the 19th century, historicism aroused a renewal of monumental stained glass from large artistic centers like Munich or Paris. From the 1910s, Romandy artists found themselves at the forefront in the stained glass domain. The expressive language of Alexandre Cingria, who drew inspiration from Mehoffer's work, stimulated an entire generation of creators, including Jean-Henri Demole, Marcel Poncet, Edmond Bille, Ernest Biéler, Louis Rivier, and Jean-Edouard de Castella. More recently, important stained glass destined for Swiss buildings were created by foreign artists, such as those of Fernand Léger at Courfaivre (1953–1954) or those of Marc Chagall in Zürich (1970).

== Metalworking ==
On Swiss territory, metallurgy (copper, gold, precious metals) is attested by archaeology from the end of the Neolithic, and it can be said that in a certain way it is the oldest specialized craftsmanship. Raw materials were of local origin and doubtless also imported. Workshops have been uncovered in Celtic oppida (from about 300 BC). In the Gallo-Roman era (from 1st century BC to 5th AD), metallurgy underwent Roman tradition influence and spread throughout colonized territory: workshops of cities, vici, and castra produced for local needs and for export (bronze). After the Empire's fall, prestige crafts, namely goldsmithing and weapon manufacturing (weapon production and trade), survived in former Roman sites, in large estates, and in convents. For everyday objects, destined especially for the peasantry, every medieval lordship had a forge, whose exploitation, until the 19th century, was subject to concession.

=== Metallurgy in cities ===
Metallurgy immediately occupied an important place in medieval cities. As in the countryside, forges were found there that worked for transport needs (horseshoes, cart parts, shipbuilding), produced tools for artisans, peasants, woodcutters, as well as all sorts of objects for daily life. Like other trades, a city's forges grouped in a street, generally along transit routes and in periphery, because of fumes and fire risks. In the manorial economy era, blacksmiths depended on the lord of the city's services (notably in Basel), before forming guilds, like other trades, in the 13th–15th centuries.

Cities' demographic, economic, and commercial rise led in metallurgy to a specialization movement, as demand appeared, according to fashions, for new products whose manufacturing required particular qualifications. From the 13th century, new trades could be distinguished, especially in weapons and decorative arts domains, which applied recent techniques, worked high-quality metals, and used costly tools and machines.

Among the oldest of these specialists are found goldsmiths attached especially to episcopal courts (Basel, Lausanne) and producing jewels and liturgical objects in gold and silver. Weapon evolution is reflected in that of branch trades: after blade refiners, halberd, armor, and cuirass manufacturers, there appeared in the 14th–15th centuries arquebus and cannon manufacturers, then in the 16th century by those of daggers and muskets. Locksmiths constituted one of principal specialized trades; they were asked for, besides locks, small objects, domestic appliances and mechanisms, sometimes complicated. From their group emerged belt makers (buckles and fine ornaments) and clockmakers (city clocks from the 14th century, then pendulum clocks and watches; watchmaking). Pewterers produced for the Church and well-off classes, coppersmiths diffused their copper receptacles in the city as in the countryside. Pin makers fashioned (from metal wire) various objects for household and farm. Scythe and sickle, axe, compass and tool, file, nail, drill, and wire manufacturers responded to peasants', woodcutters', or artisans' needs.

Specialization calls for two remarks. On one hand, manufacturing of complex objects often required several trades' collaboration: for weapons, for example, locksmiths (mechanism), borers and polishers (barrel), engravers, chasers, and burnishers (decoration). On other hand, neighboring trades shared common knowledge and techniques. For lack of work in his domain, a master could be active elsewhere, and if a specialist was lacking, another could replace him: a locksmith served as belt maker, a goldsmith passed from gold to silver, a bell founder cast cannons or funerary plaques. There was as much rivalry as solidarity among various founders, between locksmiths and arquebusiers, farriers and armorers, mechanics and clockmakers. In specialized trades, outside blacksmiths, farriers, coppersmiths, and locksmiths, the number of masters was limited; it depended on city size and profession prestige. Zurich Blacksmiths' guild united seventeen trades; around 1762, only pewterers, locksmiths, and coppersmiths counted at least ten masters and two trades had no representative. If goldsmiths were established in the 17th–18th centuries in small towns like Sursee and Wil (SG), for example, which made it their specialty, they were found especially in centers like Zurich and Basel, which however did not have the European influence of Augsburg or Nuremberg (24 masters at Basel in the 16th century, and nearly 200 at Augsburg). Public clock manufacturers, organ builders, and bell founders moved at their clients' call.

=== Guilds and professional rules ===
Contrary to what is sometimes observed in Germany, Swiss cities united in a single guild blacksmiths and other metal artisans, given their too weak numbers. They could count twelve to seventeen trades forming as many organized subgroups ("masterships"). Goldsmiths, sometimes arquebusiers, belt makers, even others still, could freely choose their guild (for example Konstaffel at Zurich, Changers at Basel, Art Artisans at Lucerne and Solothurn, Mercers at Fribourg).

Like other trades, those of metals gave themselves from the 15th–16th centuries guild and professional rules. Apprenticeship, which lasted two or three years, and up to six years for goldsmiths or clockmakers, was lengthened from the 16th century under the effect of competition. It fell to masters to buy necessary raw materials and semi-products (iron, copper, tin, brass, lead, tinplate, black sheet, wire), but guild regulations—which well distinguished from 15th–16th centuries merchants and artisans—forbade them from trading in them, except for old metals. Raw material scarcity and price increases, from the 16th century, pushed masterships to extend from cities to countryside their monopoly on old metal recovery. Coppersmiths were advantaged on this point thanks to agreements concluded with itinerant tinsmiths.

Small enterprise (one master per workshop) imposed itself from the 16th century, sparing however city workshops, municipal operations that employed blacksmiths, locksmiths, and armorers. Some large establishments with strong capitalization escaped the guild straitjacket, for example forges producing from the 15th century iron or copper semi-products. Noisy trip hammers, powered by hydraulic energy, and wire-drawing mills (from the 17th century) were located outside cities.

Artisans worked for local or regional clientele and more rarely for export (Lucerne scythes in the 15th century, gilding and watchmaking at Geneva and Neuchâtel in the 17th and 18th centuries, for example); their reputation sometimes exceeded borders (cannon founders of Bern and Zurich for example). They often struggled vigorously against merchants who imported luxury products (jewels, expensive weapons, art pewter, etc.) to sell in their shops or on city markets.

=== In the countryside ===
Until the 19th century, farriers dominated metallurgical craftsmanship in the countryside; their workshops were subject to concession and enjoyed territorial monopoly. Their activities, very varied, ranged from horse shoeing to manufacturing and repair of all kinds of tools and utensils (for agriculture, gardening, household), through nailery (for shoes, for horseshoes) and cart wheel hooping. They procured iron from merchants in the city and especially through recovery; old iron trade procured them accessory income and certain village prestige. They often made their own charcoal and gave care to horses. From the 16th century, authorities fixed prices and wages in official tariffs.

Linked like mills to agricultural activities, forges were widespread everywhere, and particularly along major roads. Demand increased like the population in the 16th–18th centuries. As established forges' monopoly prevented new ones from being created, the supply of iron and copper objects was ensured by peddlers. In the 17th century, construction's rise brought the appearance of nail and drill manufacturers enjoying official "chimney" concession, according to Alemannic expression; in Emmental for example, they worked for export. New fact, arquebusiers, clockmakers, organ builders, and especially locksmiths established themselves as cottagers and began to breach privileges, though well defended, of urban guilds and village blacksmiths.

=== Consequences of industrialization ===
In the 18th century, new materials and technique evolution made formerly reputed crafts retreat: glass and porcelain, for example, replaced pewter tableware. Mechanized production, more advantageous, began to impose itself in the 1820s, first for series objects, for example when wire-drawing mills replaced small nail forges. In iron and copper industry, rolling mills and mechanical hammers succeeded trip hammers driven by water wheel. Factory took precedence over manufacture, supplanting blacksmiths, coppersmiths, locksmiths, tinsmiths, pin makers, and tool makers in the domain of household accessories, stoves, heating stoves, vehicles, agricultural instruments, tools, etc. In the city, then in the countryside, artisans lost their clientele, who took the habit of supplying themselves in hardware stores diffusing industrial goods. Mechanization did not even retreat before luxury and precision products, such as those of watchmaking.

Around 1900, crafts structures (metallurgical or other) began to change, through trade redefinition and the retreat of unprofitable individual operations. Still numerous in 1905, this brought average workshop workforce to its maximum in 1965 (twelve people). Moribund though it was, metalworking crafts began to show signs of hope, despite prophets of doom. Surviving especially were small and medium enterprises in wrought iron, locksmithing, and metal construction domains, capable of realizing special pieces for individuals (balustrades, barriers, stairs, doors, facades, showcases, etc.), art ironwork (lamps, chandeliers, grilles, church furniture), transport, extraction, cutting installations, etc. for industry and commerce, or still apt to repair and maintain agricultural, forestry, and sanitary equipment supplied by industry. Beside industrial jewelry, goldsmiths, chasers, engravers, and others maintain artisanal quality in luxury products. At the end of the 20th century, apprenticeship in metal crafts lasts three and a half or four years, according to federal regulation.

Master locksmiths' association (founded in 1888) and that of master blacksmiths and wheelwrights (1891) merged in 1972 into Swiss Metal Union, which represents in 2001 60% of branch enterprises (about 18,000 employees). There also exist associations of master coppersmiths (1877), cutlers (1891), and goldsmiths (1894).

=== Goldsmithing ===
Goldsmithing designates artistic work practiced on gold and silver with a view to producing cultic or secular objects as well as jewelry. Techniques can be those of hammering, casting, chasing, embossing, or engraving. On present-day Swiss territory, pieces are documented from the beginning of the Bronze Age (2200-1500 BC). Besides some rare jewels, the Eschenz gold goblet (Historical Museum of Frauenfeld) should be mentioned. The Altstetten gold cup deposited at the Swiss National Museum can be dated to the beginning of the Iron Age (around 750 BC). The four torcs and three bracelets constituting the Erstfeld treasure are practically in new condition (Swiss National Museum). This treasure—offering or merchant's stock—and other jewels are representative of Celtic civilization.

Among remarkable Roman goldsmith pieces found in Switzerland but produced outside Switzerland, besides jewels, the gold bust of Marcus Aurelius discovered at Avenches (Cantonal Museum of Archaeology and History, Lausanne) and the Kaiseraugst treasure (Roman Museum of Augst) buried around 350-351 AD, composed of a complete table service, capital testimony for art and culture history of late Roman era, should be noted. High Middle Ages productions come essentially from discoveries made in tombs. Beside gold, silver, or bronze fibulae, often set with glass or almandines, richly ornamented belts and iron buckles silver-damascened have been uncovered.

Architecture, paintings, and cult ornaments of first medieval churches constituted a coherent ensemble that had to support the preaching message. This can be linked to goldsmith workshops of reputed Christian centers, like episcopal seats of Basel, Chur, Sion, abbeys of St. Gallen, Moutier-Grandval, and St. Maurice. The Basel gold altar table (Paris, Cluny Museum) and the Sion reliquary are two examples from artistic centers outside Switzerland. The shrines and reliquary head of St. Candidus at St. Maurice were however created in the convent's workshops.

From the 16th century, an affixed hallmark indicated place of origin and goldsmith's identity. Basel and Zürich, Bern to a lesser extent, were centers of supraregional influence. With the Reformation, western Switzerland and Geneva and Lausanne, former episcopal cities, lost their importance. Basel, Bern, and Zürich, also Protestant, did not experience the same fate: demand for liturgical accessories strongly reduced there, but economic success allowed the nascent bourgeoisie to acquire goldsmith pieces either for domestic use or to make sumptuous emblems of guilds. Swiss production was not limited exclusively to already mentioned cities; it is also reported in localities of lesser importance. Ticino and Grisons are exceptions, only Reichenau and Chur testifying to certain activity in this domain.

In the 19th century, Georg Adam Rehfues was one of those who resorted to semi-finished products and series production; from 1808, he directed a workshop employing up to fifty people in Bern. At Schaffhausen, where important goldsmith production already existed in the 18th century, Jezler & Cie, the only Swiss enterprise still in activity, developed from 1822. The Bossard workshops of Lucerne and Sauter of Basel were prestigious manufactures of the second half of the 19th and early 20th centuries. In the 20th century, church goldsmithing experienced new growth, particularly in the Burch workshop of Lucerne (1925–1967, in Zürich from 1932).

=== Watchmaking ===
Swiss watchmaking originated in the mid-16th century when the Protestant Reformation in Geneva redirected goldsmiths and jewelers toward timepiece production after John Calvin forbade the wearing of jewelry. Huguenot refugees brought expertise in portable watchmaking, and the craft's affinity with local goldsmithing traditions enabled rapid development. By the late 17th century, a sophisticated division of labor emerged, with separate guilds for case makers, engravers, and watchmakers. Geneva's industry reached its peak between 1770 and 1786, with products known throughout the Orient and American colonies, before the French annexation in 1798 ended the guild system.

From the 17th century, watchmaking spread throughout the Jura Arc, particularly in the Neuchâtel Mountains where the absence of guilds created favorable conditions for growth. Local expertise in metalworking trades—locksmithing, gunsmithing, and nail making—provided a foundation for horological development. Entire families engaged in the craft, developing apprenticeship practices and professional alliances. By 1890, nearly half of Swiss watch exports originated from Bernese establishments as the industry expanded into Bern, Solothurn, and beyond the Jura Arc to Basel-Landschaft and Schaffhausen. The transition from artisanal production to factory-based manufacturing occurred in the late 19th century in response to American competition, though traditional centers continued cultivating fine watchmaking alongside mechanized production of mid-range and entry-level watches.

The industry faced severe challenges including the 1921-1923 crisis, the Great Depression, and the quartz revolution of the 1970s-1980s when employment collapsed from 70,000 to around 30,000-35,000 workers. Recovery came through mass-market models like Swatch and, from the 2000s, renewed interest in luxury timepieces. By the early 21st century, Switzerland remained the world's leading watch exporter by value, with the industry concentrated in the Jura Arc cantons and accounting for approximately 4% of the country's GDP. The sector evolved from its artisanal origins into a sophisticated industry combining traditional craftsmanship with advanced microtechnology, employing approximately 60,000 people directly.

== Printing ==
=== Diffusion and significance in the 15th and 16th centuries ===
Seals coated with color and applied to varied supports (wood, fabric, papyrus, parchment) have been known since Antiquity. In the 15th century, engraving and xylographica, manufactured by means of wood tablets, appeared. It was necessary to await the invention of printing by movable lead characters for book manufacturing to be revolutionized: it is indeed this process that Gutenberg used from 1450 to print the Latin Bible and various ecclesiastical texts in his Mainz workshop. During the 1460s, one of his companions, Berthold Ruppel, introduced this new art to Basel, which gained importance in a few years. The oldest dated Swiss printed work, the Mammotrectus (10 November 1470), mentions however not Basel but Beromünster as the printing place. Due to the fact that incunabula (the name given to printed works before 1500) bore only exceptionally a date, printer's name, or printing place, early mentions reveal little about their origin. Incunabula from Beromünster (1470–1473), Berthoud (1475), Zurich (1479–1482), Rougemont (1481), Promenthoux (1482), Lausanne (1493), and Sursee (1499–1500) are known, totaling thirty titles, of which a third are broadsheets. They were the work of itinerant printers who accepted short-term commissions. Many among them worked at Beromünster, Baden, Fribourg, Lucerne, Poschiavo, Porrentruy, St. Gallen, and Schaffhausen. At Serrières (today comm. Neuchâtel) the first French translation of the Bible was printed in 1532, and at Sursee in 1500, Niklaus Schradin's verse chronicle on the Swabian War was printed. The workshop founded at Bern in 1537 by Matthias Apiarius, a pioneer of musical score printing, even maintained itself for twenty-five years.

The first major printing centers were Basel from about 1465, Geneva from 1478, and Zurich from 1521. In the Rhine university city, it even became an activity of European importance. Until 1500, more than seventy printers are attested there, among them Bernhard Richel and Michael Wenssler. Among printer-booksellers (publishing houses), Johannes Amerbach, Jean Froben, Johannes Petri, Nicolaus Episcopius, Johann Herwagen, Robert Winter, and Jean Oporin must be cited. Basel printing owed its rapid European renown to topicality, as well as the quality and extended choice of proposed works, which concerned theology (notably the Latin Bible and Church Fathers or the Talmud, 1578–1588), civil and canon law, secular literature (among others Greek and Roman authors), and linguistics (for example a Hebrew grammar and dictionary). Scholars and writers of the first rank, such as Sebastian Brant and Erasmus, accepted being published for the first time in Basel (notably Erasmus for the Greek New Testament, in 1516). These works presented careful typography and were illustrated by the best artists of the era, like Hans Holbein the Younger and Urs Graf the Elder.

Geneva was also an important printing center, known at first for its publications of novels and edification works in French. With the Reformation came the addition of Jean Calvin's works, printed at Jean Girard's (†1558). But it was French refugees, such as Jean Crespin, Conrad Badius, and Robert Estienne—experienced booksellers and typographers—who founded the city's international renown, notably by publishing a large number of Bible editions, theological works (for example Calvin's catechism in Hebrew), and ancient language dictionaries (such as Thesaurus Linguae Latinae and Thesaurus Linguae Graecae).

In the Reformation's extension, Zurich became the third great printing center. Besides Johannes Hager, it is certainly Christoph Froschauer who comes closest to Basel printers' performances through his works of excellent typographic quality and great ornamental richness. In his workshop were published Luther's writings and those of Zurich reformers, a Bible edition (Froschauer Bible, 1524–1529), and later history, geography, and natural science treatises, such as Johannes Stumpf's Chronik der Eidgenossenschaft (1547/1548) and Konrad Gessner's works. Various other printers, among whom brothers Andreas and Jakob Gessner, published theological works and classics beside popular printed matter.

The printed book of the 15th and 16th centuries, whose presentation and characters closely drew inspiration from manuscript models in the beginning, had already largely diverged from them before 1500. Theme choice was totally oriented toward the cultivated reader. Thus most publications had a theological character. In second place came humanist books of philology or ancient literature, law, history, geography, and natural sciences. Secular literature occupied third place. However, besides these ambitious works, print shops also regularly produced from their presses ordinary printed matter, such as broadsheets, playing cards, engravings, and popular almanacs.

Printers formed an elite of commercial entrepreneurs and technicians, as had been before them paper mill founders and as would later be textile industrialists. They interested themselves in new domains of knowledge and were open to modern currents, notably the Reformation. As printer-publishers, they determined publication programs, generally in close collaboration with their scholarly authors, to whom they were sometimes united by bonds of friendship (for example, Jean Froben and Erasmus), but also by agreement with universities and academies. As booksellers, they personally attended book fairs at Leipzig, Frankfurt, Paris, and Lyon. From the 16th century, however, a tendency appeared aiming to separate printing, publishing, and bookselling into distinct specialties.

The enterprise form was a workshop (as was generally the case in craftsmanship) comprising tooling and personnel, master, journeymen, and apprentices. Various operations of character founding, form engraving, composition, printing, and proofreading did not constitute autonomous trades. For large-scale projects, printers grouped into communities, as, around 1500, Jean Froben, Johannes Amerbach, and Johannes Petri did, or, around 1780, Johann Jakob Thurneysen and character founder Wilhelm Haas. From the 16th century, the family working community was established, indicated particularly when a large number of enterprises were united in the same locality; this was the case of Froschauer in Zurich, who combined printing, a publishing house, bookstore, typographic foundry, wood engraving, bookbinding, and paper mill. The Hautt family—printers, publishers, and booksellers—who had their principal seat at Lucerne since 1636, also resided and worked in Vienna, then at Fribourg from 1711.

Many known printers were immigrants: those of Basel came mainly from Alsace or Germany, those of Zurich from Germany, and those of Geneva originated from Germany, the Netherlands, and France. Persecuted and driven out for religious motives but increasingly also, in the 17th and 18th centuries, for political reasons, they had found refuge in the more tolerant Confederation. Like other privileged trades (apothecary, goldsmith, papermaker), printing was reserved primarily for citizenship right holders. Foreign printers, highly sought after, were therefore rapidly naturalized. Bavarian Christoph Froschauer was conferred graciously Zurich citizenship in 1519 "because of his art." Considered indeed as such, printing was exempted from corporative obligations of other crafts. Printers therefore entered mainly merchant guilds.

Most of the time, they affixed their mark on works that left their workshops. Many works appeared, however, under false printer names and printing places, particularly reprints or pirate printings of successful works, such as reformers' writings published at Serrières by Pierre de Vingle. Reprints were widespread, notably for lack of effective legal protection, all the more so as printing privileges were easy to circumvent since they were most often applicable only in the place or territory where they had been enacted. Even royal and imperial privileges were not respected throughout the Empire. Thus Erasmus's Praise of Folly and, from the 18th century, German, English, and French classics were constantly reprinted. Beat Ludwig Walthard's classical editions after 1765 are known as "Bern reprints."

=== 17th to early 19th century ===
The great movements that permitted printing's rise were humanism and Reformation, which explains why its centers of influence developed in the most active intellectual and theological centers—later won over to the Reformation—which were the cities of Basel, Geneva, and Zurich. From the end of the 16th century, new currents favored the emergence of other production places, notably the Catholic Reformation in the 17th century, general demand for literary, philosophical, and scientific works under Enlightenment influence, the awakening of interest in newspapers and periodicals (press), and the considerable needs of public administrations.

Printing centers thus appeared in Catholic Switzerland. In the Einsiedeln convent workshop, created in 1664, monumental works of theology, liturgy, and history were printed in several volumes (for example Augustin Reding's Theologia Scholastica, 1687). Lucerne became from 1636, thanks to David Hautt, a printing place for religious, geographical, and historical works, such as Heinrich Murer's Helvetia Sancta (1648). In St. Gallen abbey principality, a workshop first installed at Sankt Johann convent from 1633, then at St. Gallen from 1640, also printed theological works and school books, notably Abbot Cölestin Sfondrati's Cursus theologicus (1670) and Cursus philosophicus (1686).

Basel, Geneva, and Zurich continued to publish bibles in all sorts of versions and languages, spiritual edification books, teaching works, and calendars. From the 17th century, family enterprises were very widespread: at Basel the König, Decker, Genath and Pistorius, Thurneysen and Im Hof workshops; at Geneva the Bousquet, Cramer, and Gosse; at Bern the Haller, Walthard, and Gruner; at St. Gallen the Hochreutiner, Weniger, and Zollikofer. At Zurich was born the Orell & Compagnie workshop (later Orell Füssli), resulting from financial participations founded on family ties.

Stagnation of the 17th century due to the Thirty Years' War ended at the time of the Enlightenment: after 1750, demand for secular publications amplified in political, historical, philosophical, and literary domains (including fashionable works such as travel books). The Basel printer family Thurneysen is an example of this evolution. While, under the direction of Johann Jakob the father (1723–1787), the workshop printed edifying works, school textbooks, and calendars, it diffused, under the direction of Johann Jakob the son (1754–1803), works of Voltaire, Rousseau, and Frederick II in the original language, but especially reprints of historians, philosophers, writers, literary historians, economists, and politicians. Thanks to Johann Jakob Bodmer, Johann Jakob Breitinger, Salomon Gessner, and Johann Kaspar Lavater, as well as the careful work of enterprises like Orell & Compagnie, Zurich again became in the 18th century a printing center.

At Geneva, among many others, brothers Gabriel and Philibert Cramer, from a mathematician family, made a name through their publications on mathematics and their editions of Voltaire's works. Historiographies, encyclopedias (encyclopedic dictionaries), and thesauruses, highly appreciated in the 18th century, were also published in new places, such as at Yverdon (Encyclopédie d'Yverdon, 1770–1780, at Fortuné-Barthélemy de Félice's) and at Neuchâtel (Description des Arts et Métiers, 1771–1783, at Société typographique de Neuchâtel).

Growing interest in current events aroused demand for newspapers and periodicals. In 1597, Leonhard Straub published at Rorschach what was probably the first German-language monthly with regular publication, Annus Christi. The 17th and 18th centuries' weeklies (called "Journal," "Feuille," or "Poste") most often had political and economic content, but sometimes also, like Chur's Leseblatt zum Nutzen und Vergnügen (1786), an entertainment purpose. Specialized reviews with literary character were entertaining, while keeping a didactic objective (Johann Jakob Bodmer and Johann Jakob Breitinger's Discourse der Mahlern, 1721–1722) and link with current events (Jacob Verne's Choix littéraire, 1755–1760). At Lugano, the Milanese Agnelli family published, beside religious and scientific works, the political weekly Nuove di diversi corti e paesi, in which were commented, from 1746, Lombardy troubles. Introduction of press freedom under the Helvetic Republic led to a wave of creations: sixty-nine new periodicals appeared in all Switzerland between 1798 and 1799. In Romandy, Lausanne rose to rank of press center.

From the 16th century, writing suddenly increased in administrations. Both in ecclesiastical principalities and in city-states, authorities resorted to printing to master this paper flow. At Bern, the council established in 1589 an official printing house that lasted until 1831. In other cities, a resident printer obtained the status of official or municipal printer. It was a coveted position of trust, as it brought its holder the totality of public orders. The State printer received a salary, sometimes had the right to free housing, benefited from printing privileges, and generally remained long in place; thus the first state printer at Bern, Georg Sonnleitner, was in function for forty years. It was not rare for privilege to become hereditary.

Official orders included broadsheets destined for posting, for example morals or clothing mandates, but also price and wage tariffs in craftsmanship and industry, or periodicals such as state yearbooks and official notice sheets. Legal texts (the first was Bern city statutes in 1615), customs tariffs, and judicial administration taxes were added from the 17th century. Ecclesiastical states exploited their own print shops, Basel bishopric since 1592 (at Porrentruy) and St. Gallen abbey principality since 1633. To simplify property administration, the first printed collection of official documents (Codex Traditionum) appeared in 1645 at St. Gallen.

Printing center concentration in capitals was linked to authorities' power politics. Opening a print shop required concession. Until the 18th century, this was generally granted only to entrepreneurs residing in the capital. Print shops founded without authorization in subject cities, for example that opened in 1556 at Lausanne, met with government repression. Bern suppressed the concession obligation only at the time of the Enlightenment (1767), when it could no longer forbid print shops outside the capital; however, it then subjected them to all the more severe censorship.

The latter had been introduced in the 16th century to protect prevailing confessional doctrine. According to circumstances, it was applied more or less severely. The Holy See regularly published, between 1559 and 1966, the Index librorum prohibitorum, a list of forbidden works. In 1559, the totality of books printed at Basel figured there, bearing grave prejudice to their export. Protestant cantons also drew up such lists, notably Bern when it combated pietism (1695).

=== 19th and 20th century innovations ===
The 19th and 20th centuries brought considerable innovations to printing. Most radical was, during the last third of the 18th century, the definitive separation between book production, publishing, and sales units. Publishing houses and bookstores appropriated a leading role, print shops being reduced to receiving and executing their orders, whether as simple publishing house departments or as autonomous enterprises. On the union level, the graphic arts industry played a precursor role from the second half of the 19th century in wage and social protection questions.

Technical innovations were particularly striking from the second half of the 18th century. At Basel, Wilhelm Haas, father and son, contributed through press improvement, invention of typometric composition for cartographic printing, and creation of numerous new typefaces. The mechanical press had a quasi-revolutionary effect in the 1830s, when it replaced the manual press, a revolution later completed by the rotary press. At the end of the 19th century, the composing machine supplanted hand composition, the first time in 1893 at Jent & Cie, Bund printing house of Bern. Thus linotypes and monotypes dominated composition until the 1960s.

Offset or planographic printing process, invented already in 1904, replaced lead composition with photocomposition from the 1960s and, especially, with digital composition (photocomposition and computer composition) since the 1970s. At the end of the 20th century, it had already almost completely supplanted relief printing; digital computer printing was most often employed for small runs and personalized advertising. In the image reproduction domain, evolution was no less radical: halftone technique rationalized the graphic industry, rotogravure improved it. Since the 1980s, electronic graphic reproduction made older processes largely retreat. From the second half of the 20th century also appeared, beside the printed book, the electronic book on various supports, such as magnetic tape, diskette, CD-ROM, Internet, and e-book reader.

== Extractive trades ==
=== Charcoal ===
Charcoal is obtained artisanally through slow and incomplete wood combustion in pits and kilns: dry wood (hardwoods or softwoods) is piled in a hollow conical kiln covered with fir branches, charcoal powder, and clay, kiln that is left to burn ten to fifteen days while measuring air intake. Quantity obtained represents some 20-25% of original weight.

Wood carbonization probably dates back to prehistory, in connection with metalworking; archaeological sites at the southern Jura foot attest to its presence simultaneously with iron ore reduction in Celtic era. Coal being rare, charcoal was employed from Middle Ages by artisans, especially by blacksmiths, in mines and in glassworks due to its high calorific power. Pulverized, it served for sharpening and polishing and was one of black powder components. Ash was used as laundry lye. Throughout Switzerland, charcoal burners worked in forests near villages, but production was particularly intensive in mining regions of Basel bishopric, Neuchâtel principality, and Vaud Jura.

Strong demand was not unrelated to general wood shortage dating from the 16th century. To protect forest, authorities endeavored to strictly regulate production. They first forbade exportation. Then communes and private owners, among whom blast furnaces and forges, had to obtain authorization to make charcoal from their forest woods. Number of professionals was limited and patent became necessary. In the 18th century, charcoal burners could no longer supply themselves from timber forests. They had to fall back on waste, stumps, and windfalls. Charcoal kilns were confined to forests of difficult access from which charcoal, light, could however be easily transported. This is why manufacturing maintained itself in poorly accessible areas of Jura and Napf until well into the 20th century, although coal imports had virtually supplanted charcoal from the 19th century. This evolution was only briefly interrupted during two world wars when country self-sufficiency was sought. New demand generated by grilling practice ensures occasional work for some Entlebuch charcoal burners.

=== Wood ===
Wood craftsmanship represented one of Switzerland's most essential artisanal sectors from prehistoric times through the industrial era. Archaeological evidence from underwater sites demonstrates that prehistoric peoples primarily utilized hardwoods—oak, beech, ash, maple, yew, and fruit trees—for manufacturing tools and utilitarian objects. During the Middle Ages and early modern period, rural areas consumed enormous quantities of wood for agricultural infrastructure including stakes and palisades. Stakes removed after harvest to permit common pasture dried during summer and subsequently served as fuel, demonstrating the integrated nature of wood use in traditional agricultural society.

Throughout medieval and early modern Switzerland, wood served as the fundamental raw material for tools, furniture, barrels, and presses. Urban and rural joiners produced custom furniture and interior fittings including floors, wainscoting, doors, and window frames. Specialized artisans emerged during the Middle Ages, including coopers, wheelwrights, and turners, each developing distinct technical expertise. Artistically crafted wooden pieces for churches and public buildings required highly skilled cabinetmakers, marquetry workers, and carvers—privileged urban artisans whose clientele extended to wealthy individuals commissioning precious furniture. In Alemannic cities, building trades organized into corporations, with particularly accomplished carpenters gaining reputations as architects or master builders beyond their regions.

The 19th century witnessed wood's continued ubiquity in daily life, with the material present in household utensils, craft and agricultural implements, tableware, storage and transport containers, mill equipment, boats, carts, and carriages. Serial production in carpentry and furniture manufacturing began around 1850, expanding significantly after 1880 during Switzerland's economic boom. A distinctive form of wood artisanship emerged in the Bernese Oberland, where wood sculpture at home was initiated in Brienz during the 1816–1817 famine. This production, sold primarily to tourists as souvenirs, provided supplementary income for rural families but remained highly dependent on economic conditions, with employment fluctuating from 1,307 workers in 1884 to 614 in 1930 and 405 in 1939. The transition to industrial wood production in the 20th century gradually displaced traditional artisanal methods, though mechanized joinery initially extended artisanal techniques to door, window, and parquet production before fully industrialized processes dominated the sector.

== See also ==
- Guilds in Switzerland
