= Cordula von Schönau =

Swiss Dominican nun and scribe (c. 1472–1536)

- Born: Elisabeth von Schönau c. 1472
- Died: before 13 March 1536; Constance
- Occupations: Dominican nun; scribe
- Known for: Copying manuscripts for the Dominican observance
- Parent(s): Victor von Schönau; Barbara Harzer

Cordula von Schönau, born Elisabeth von Schönau (c. 1472 – before 13 March 1536), was a Dominican nun, novice mistress, and scribe who copied numerous manuscripts at the convents of St. Katharina in St. Gallen and Zoffingen in Constance.

== Biography ==
Elisabeth von Schönau was the daughter of Victor von Schönau and Barbara Harzer, and was destined for convent life at an early age. Her mother belonged to a patrician family of Constance, while her father, a member of the city's great council, came from a family of the Zürich Konstaffel that had been established in Constance since the 14th century.

In 1484 she entered the Dominican convent of St. Katharina at St. Gallen and later took the religious name Cordula. She was the first novice admitted to the strict enclosure introduced there in 1482. From 1492 Cordula von Schönau is attested several times as having written entries in the convent's "sisters' book" and register, and as the copyist of at least six religious manuscripts, preserved at the new St. Katharina convent at Wil and at the abbey library of St. Gallen.

After Bishop Hugo von Hohenlandenberg secured the reform of the Zoffingen convent at Constance in 1497 with the help of the sisters of St. Katharina in St. Gallen, Cordula von Schönau and another reforming sister, Kunigunde Ensinger, were sent to Constance in 1498 to make up a shortage of personnel. There she served as novice mistress and as keeper of the wardrobe, and contributed substantially to the convent's reform. Together with Regina Sattler she produced at least seven copies that survive today for the library of Zoffingen between 1504 and 1508. Women active in manuscript production were not uncommon in urban settings around 1500, but Cordula von Schönau stood out for the speed and quality of the work she produced for the needs of the Dominican observance.

Her much younger sister, Barbara von Schönau, also entered the Zoffingen convent in 1498. Barbara left it in March 1527 in the wake of the Reformation and married the burgher Achatius Frömbd. Cordula von Schönau and the other nuns who had remained at Zoffingen converted to Protestantism under pressure from the city council during the second half of 1527. Bearing her baptismal name once more, Elisabeth von Schönau claimed her rights to the family inheritance before the council of Constance in 1530. She died at the beginning of 1536, as attested by a letter of 13 March 1536 from Thomas Blarer to his brother, the reformer Ambrosius Blarer.

== Bibliography ==
- K. Beyerle, Die Konstanzer Ratslisten des Mittelalters, 1898
- T. K. Vogler, Geschichte des Dominikanerinnen-Klosters St. Katharina in St. Gallen. 1228–1607, 1938, 154, 234–236
- B. Hilberling, 700 Jahre Kloster Zoffingen 1257–1957, 1957
- H.-C. Rublack, Die Einführung der Reformation in Konstanz. Von den Anfängen bis zum Abschluss 1531, 1971
- S. Mengis, Schreibende Frauen um 1500. Scriptorium und Bibliothek des Dominikanerinnenklosters St. Katharina St. Gallen, 2013
- R. F. Fasching, Die "Vierzig Myrrhenbüschel vom Leiden Christi". Untersuchung, Überlieferung und Edition, 2 vols., 2020

=== Sources ===
- Badische Historische Kommission, ed., Briefwechsel der Brüder Ambrosius und Thomas Blaurer, 1509–1567, vol. 1, 1908
- M. Burckhardt, P. Ladner et al., eds., Katalog der datierten Handschriften in der Schweiz in lateinischer Schrift vom Anfang des Mittelalters bis 1550, vol. 3, 1991, 286–287
- A. Willing, ed., Das "Konventsbuch" und das "Schwesternbuch" aus St. Katharina in St. Gallen. Kritische Edition und Kommentar, 2016

=== Archives ===
- Dominikanerinnenkloster St. Katharina, Wil, Chronicle ("Konventsbuch"); Schwesternbuch; M 3; M 13
- Erzbischöfliches Archiv Freiburg, Freiburg im Breisgau, Handschriften
- Leopold-Sophien-Bibliothek, Überlingen, Ms. 22
- Stiftsbibliothek St. Gallen, Cod. Sang. 406; Cod. Sang. 491
