= Andreas Schmid =

Topics referred to by the same term

Andreas Schmid may refer to:

- Andreas Schmid (merchant) (1504–1565), Swiss merchant and magistrate from Zürich
- Andreas Schmid (alpine skier), Austrian para-alpine skier
