= Brun's guild revolution =

1336 coup in Zurich led by Rudolf Brun

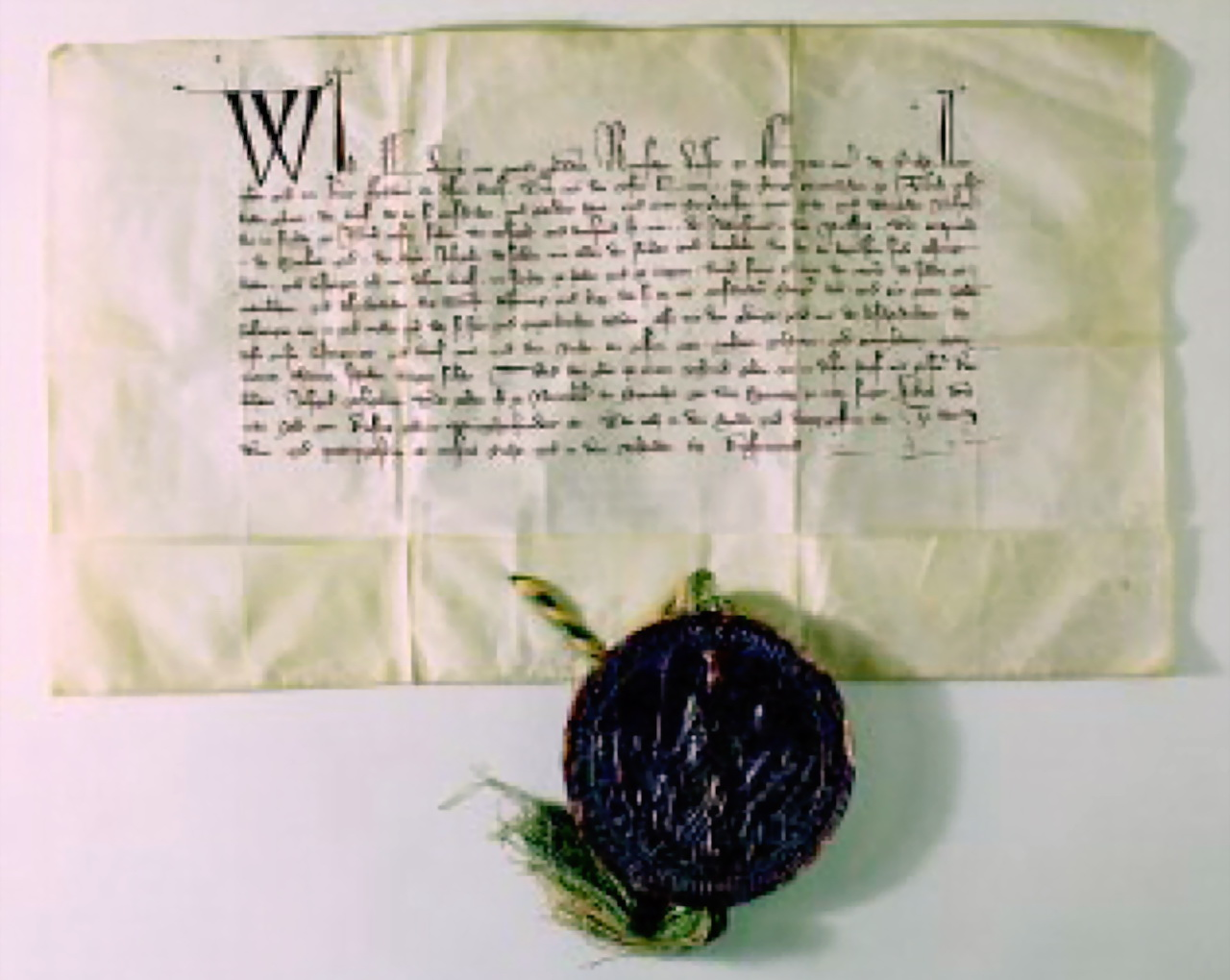
- Emperor Louis IV's charter of 2 April 1337 confirming the First Sworn Letter
- Native name: Brun'sche Zunftrevolution
- Date: June 1336
- Location: Zurich
- Participants: Rudolf Brun and the craftsmen of Zurich
- Outcome: Old council overthrown; council of 26 under the First Sworn Letter; Brun mayor for life

Brun's guild revolution (German: Brun'sche Zunftrevolution) was the overthrow of the ruling council of Zurich in June 1336 by the knight Rudolf Brun with the help of the city's craftsmen. Under the new constitution, the First Sworn Letter (Erster Geschworener Brief), the council consisted of 13 members of the Konstaffel and the 13 masters of the craftsmen's guilds, and Brun held the office of mayor for life.

== History ==
At the beginning of the 14th century, one third of the ruling council of the city of Zurich were noble knights and two thirds were burgher notables (rentiers, money changers, merchants, goldsmiths and others). The waning influence of the nobles led the knight Rudolf Brun to put himself at the head of a movement to overthrow the council. With the help of the craftsmen, who until then had been organized only in craft associations (Innungen) and not in guilds with a political mandate, he overthrew the old council in June 1336. After the coup, the First Sworn Letter limited the influence of the burgher merchant patriciate. Under this new constitution the council had 26 members. Thirteen were provided by the Konstaffel, which comprised the knights and the wholesale merchants, and seven of them had to be knights. The other 13 councillors were the guild masters of the craftsmen's guilds. In this way the social forces neutralized each other, and the actual influence of the craftsmen's guilds remained rather small; in this respect the term Zunftrevolution ("guild revolution"), coined by older research, needs revision. Because Brun had the office of mayor (Bürgermeister) conferred on himself for life, he dominated the council so strongly that modern authors have also compared his position with that of an Italian city tyrant.

In 1337 Brun defeated his opponents, who had been banished from the city or had fled it and had gathered in Rapperswil, at the Battle of Grynau. A counter-coup by the opposition outside the city in 1350 was bloodily suppressed (the Zurich Mordnacht, "night of murder").

== Later development ==
The fundamental position that the First Sworn Letter gave the Zurich guilds as electoral bodies remained in force, despite many changes, until the end of the Old Swiss Confederacy. By contrast, the particular features of Brun's constitution, the unusually strong position of the mayor and the large share of knights in the council, were quickly abandoned after Brun's death in 1360. Real political power shifted to the merchants and to individual craftsmen engaged in trade, who increasingly set the tone in the city as a whole as well as in the Konstaffel and in the individual guilds.

== Bibliography ==
- K. Dändliker, Geschichte der Stadt und des Kantons Zürich, vol. 1, 1908, pp. 126–145
- O. Sigg, "Zunftherrlichkeit 1336–1798", in 650 Jahre Zürcher Zünfte, 1336–1986, 1986, p. 12
- Geschichte des Kantons Zürich, vol. 1, pp. 366–369
