= Matthias Wyss =

Mayor of Zürich (c. 1460–1528)

- Born: c. 1460; Zürich, Switzerland
- Died: 13 July 1528; Zürich, Switzerland
- Occupations: Weaver, magistrate

Matthias Wyss (c. 1460 – 13 July 1528) was a magistrate and mayor of Zürich. A wealthy and influential figure through his many offices, he favored the introduction of the Reformation.

== Biography ==
Wyss was the son of Niklaus, a guild master. He married first Anna Müller and second Regula Stapfer, daughter of Jakob, a knight and bailiff of Thurgau. A weaver by trade, he later lived as a rentier.

Wyss was a member of the Council of Zürich for the Waag and then the Meisen guilds (1489–1498), a freely elected member in 1501 (that is, outside the guilds), mayor (1502–1510), and councillor (1511–1528). He served as treasurer (1492, 1513–1517, and 1524–1527) and as keeper of the key (1519–1528), being a co-holder of the key giving access to the city's seal, banner, and treasury, and as imperial bailiff (1523–1527). Wealthy and highly influential through his accumulation of offices, and an opponent of foreign pensions, he favored for that reason the introduction of the Reformation.

== Bibliography ==
- W. Jacob, Politische Führungsschicht und Reformation, 1970, 303–305
