= Guilds in Switzerland =

Medieval and early modern trade associations

Guilds in Switzerland were associations of craftsmen and merchants that emerged in Swiss cities during the Middle Ages and played a significant role in urban economic, political, and social life until their abolition in the 19th century. The emergence of guilds was linked to that of the urban bourgeoisie, which from the end of the 13th century sought to participate in political power.

== Terminology and origins ==
In the 12th century, craftsmen in the cities of Western and Central Europe began to organize themselves by trade or groups of trades into associations. These organizations were known by various names: in French, corporations; in Italian, mestiere or arte (later corporazione); in German, Zunft (first attested in Basel in 1226), Gilde (in Northern Germany), or Gaffel (in the Lower Rhine region).

In the 19th century, historians and economists debated the origins of guilds extensively. Some traced them back to professional associations linked to the manorial economy, others saw them as free associations resulting from the medieval associative movement, while still others viewed them as institutions created by city lords to better control the market. Current scholarship considers that guilds were able to emerge thanks to urban charters, certain provisions of which escaped the feudal order.

== Late Middle Ages ==
=== Organization and functions ===
Alongside material reasons that were long considered decisive, religious, ethical, and juridical motives played an important role, as the guild community offered protection to its members and obligated them to provide mutual aid. The goal was not to maximize profits, but to guarantee a minimum livelihood. Based on the idea that a master in his workshop should only seek to ensure his existence, guilds fixed prices and wages, production levels, and the maximum number of journeymen per workshop. They prohibited the hoarding of raw materials so that everyone could obtain supplies at the market. This medieval vision of work, just price, and just wage, with its limitations and controls, was sometimes viewed as a brake on development by advocates of economic liberalism and by Marxists, and sometimes perceived nostalgically as a kind of sober, pre-modern wisdom.

Guilds were called upon to fulfill multiple functions. They defended the interests of trades by seeking to ensure their prosperity, protected them against external competition, and handled professional training. They established quality standards and ensured their observance. At the same time, they constituted religious confraternities working for the salvation of their members' souls and cultivated a form of sociability both in daily life and during guild festivals. Additionally, they took charge of tasks such as fire-fighting and the military defense of the city. In certain places, they participated in government. However, their structures and functions varied considerably according to historical evolution and local political and economic situations.

=== Early guild charters ===
The Basel guild charters of 1226-1271 are among the oldest founding documents. They established that members of a trade had freely decided to form a guild, approved by the bishop, lord of the city. The central point of the agreement was the obligation to belong to the guild in order to practice the trade in question. Fines pronounced in case of violation of regulations were divided by thirds between the bishop, the city, and the guild. The bishop appointed a provost or guild master from among the members of the association and designated one of his ministeriales each year to exercise high supervision. While guilds were encouraged by the bishops of Basel, they were prohibited by the charter (Richtebrief) of 1281 in Zurich, a city dominated by an alliance of merchants and knights who wanted to prevent craftsmen from achieving autonomy.

=== Guild struggles and political participation ===
The period from the 13th to the 15th century was marked by guild struggles—sometimes even referred to as revolutions—opposing craftsmen to the patriciate in serious civil conflicts over constitutional issues. A series of urban revolts affected German-speaking Switzerland and southwestern Germany. Wealthy merchants and prosperous craftsmen, in coalition and sometimes led by a nobleman, defeated the city's secular or ecclesiastical lord and imposed their presence on the council.

In Zurich, the knight Rudolf Brun allied himself with craftsmen and overthrew the council with their help in 1336 (Brun's revolution). Under the new regime, seats on the Great and Small Councils were allocated to the twelve craftsmen's guilds and to the guild of knights and rentiers, called the Konstaffel. In Basel, guilds gained access to the council in 1337, through constitutional means. Craftsmen also prevailed in small towns: Rheinfelden (1331), Winterthur (1342), Solothurn (1344), St. Gallen (1353), and Chur (1465).

While guilds dominated all public life in guild cities such as Zurich, Schaffhausen, and Basel, they had only a secondary political role (such as the designation of bannerets in Bern) or none at all in Fribourg, Lucerne, and Bern, cantonal capitals with patrician regimes.

New disputes, sometimes violent, broke out in many places in the 15th and 16th centuries, and even until the early 18th century, because simple craftsmen who had helped merchants and wealthy craftsmen take power felt excluded from public life. The new leaders increasingly sought less input from the base and formed a closed group renewed by co-option. The opposition attacked the policy of secrecy conducted by the authorities, particularly in financial matters. When not stifled at birth under the name of conspiracy, these troubles could lead to a new distribution of power within the guild regime.

=== Regional variations ===
The history of guilds unfolded differently in French-speaking cities and in Ticino. The grouping of craftsmen into companies, societies, masteries, or confraternities (the latter term better corresponding to the role to which they were often limited) occurred later, in the 14th-15th centuries. In Lausanne as in Geneva, confraternities disappeared at the Reformation. In Geneva, more than forty trades were constituted as masteries at the end of the 16th century, sometimes under government impetus and under its control from 1557 onward, but they played no political role. In the Principality of Neuchâtel, trades were quasi-free. The Swiss landscape was thus highly contrasted.

In German-speaking Switzerland, guilds were established even in the countryside. They appeared in the 15th and 16th centuries in Bernese, Lucerne, Solothurn, and Aargau territories. They were rare in territories under guild cities (which sought to control all craft activities and suppressed the "illegal" competition of the countryside), but were found, for example, in Basel bailiwicks from the 16th century. They also existed in the towns of Schwyz, Altdorf, Stans, and Sarnen; other pre-Alpine regions lacked them. As in cities, they regulated the training of apprentices and protected themselves against external and unfair competition, for example from botchers and women.

=== Supralocal organizations ===
Medieval guilds were not confined to the local framework. They formed vast associations of craftsmen that extended, for example, throughout the Upper or Middle Rhine; they sent delegates to meetings that were also held in small towns such as Laufenburg or Baden. Debates concerned economic agreements, guild regulations, and especially in the Upper Rhine region, the strategy to adopt in response to journeymen's demands, who were also organizing to exchange information about the situation and actions of masters.

Such associations existed among potters (the Basel knight Henman Offenburg received as a fief from the emperor in 1435 the function of "chief of the potters' league of towns and countryside between Ravensburg and Strasbourg"), carpenters, wheelwrights, and stonemasons, as well as for hosiers (from the 16th century) and tinsmiths, who, being very geographically dispersed, gathered in "circles." Confessional divisions appear to have ended these associations in the 16th-17th centuries.

== Early modern period ==
=== Religious antagonisms and social conflicts ===
At the Reformation, religious antagonisms were added to old economic oppositions. In many cases, particularly in Basel and Zurich, simple craftsmen, mostly favorable to the new faith, stood up against the authorities faithful to Catholicism, drawn from the class of merchants and wealthy craftsmen. In Basel, the former abolished on this occasion the possibility of belonging to multiple guilds—to one as a physical person (Leibzünftigkeit), which implied participation in obligatory services (watch, fire-fighting, army), and to others spiritually (Seelzünftigkeit), which gave access to their religious and confraternal activities. This practice had allowed "physical" members of privileged guilds (Herrenzünfte: traders, grocers, wine merchants, money changers, and goldsmiths) to take control of craftsmen's guilds and thus of the council; all economic and political leaders came from this milieu.

=== Social and charitable activities ===
Guilds considered their social and charitable activities essential. Members met in their houses and Trinkstuben (drinking rooms), whose location, architecture, decoration, furniture, and silverware expressed the wealth and prestige of their owners. Ritual banquets, festivals, and official ceremonies reinforced internal solidarity and allowed the affirmation of a strong identity to the outside world. Visible during great processions, princely receptions, oath-taking ceremonies, shooting festivals, and confederal visits, the order of precedence of guilds depended on their seniority or prestige.

Economic difficulties and the decline of certain trades in the 16th century accentuated the tendency toward closure that had appeared in the late Middle Ages. Potential candidates for mastership faced financial and ideological barriers. Strictly observed since the Reformation, criteria of legitimate birth and "honorability" excluded from guilds children born out of wedlock, those whose parents or grandparents bore this stain, those whose father practiced a "vile" trade (executioners, knackers, gravediggers, or even, at certain times and places, bathers, shepherds, and linen weavers), those from adherents of another confession, non-citizens, or—in German-speaking areas—"Welsches" (Romance speakers), as well as Jews. These criteria limited the circle of girls and women whom a future master could consider marrying. Guild membership remained low as a result, as well as due to the fees imposed on journeymen wishing to be admitted to mastership (execution of a masterpiece, entrance fee, banquet, honor wine, gift to the confraternity).

=== Women and guilds ===
Masters' widows and their daughters enjoyed certain rights. A widow could replace the deceased for some time, but it was expected that she would transfer the workshop either to a new husband—if he belonged to the same guild—or to her son, so as to restore the normal state of affairs. The Confederation did not have true female guilds such as those known in the textile trades in Paris, Cologne, and Nördlingen (where mistresses trained apprentices, while their husbands took care of buying raw materials and marketing production). At the end of the Middle Ages, women began to be banned from craft activities, even masters' own daughters. Journeymen refused to work with women or for masters who trained them. They threatened to boycott these employers to dissuade them from employing women and apprentices, who were paid less. Their attitude undoubtedly reflects a situation of economic competition; it also reveals, on the one hand, the conviction that women's work has less value than that of journeymen, whose quality was recognized by rituals and public law procedures, and on the other hand, an attachment to masculine values and their forms of collective expression.

=== Professional rituals and social stratification ===
Precise rites marked the passage from the state of apprentice to that of journeyman, then to master. But the social inequalities that deepened in cities of the late Middle Ages changed guild structures and the conditions for practicing trades. Often journeymen could no longer find a master's position and had to be content with their status. If they accepted work outside their trade, for example if they harvested to earn some money, they damaged the honor of the guild and risked being excluded from it. Masters fell into dependence on merchants or wealthier colleagues for whom they worked. Many therefore went to establish themselves in the countryside, where they could produce at lower cost while trying to keep their clientele. By withdrawing from their guild, they escaped taxes and services (watch duty), but also lost protection. Moreover, in the vicinity of guild cities, they were considered botchers, competitors to be eliminated.

=== Proto-industrialization ===
The gap between rich and poor masters favored the formation of dependencies and clientelist relationships through subcontracting. With proto-industrialization, manufacturing tended to move to the countryside, especially in textiles and watchmaking. From the 16th century, urban guilds had to confront the competition of the Verlagssystem (and later of the manufactory), organized in the countryside by merchant-entrepreneurs and by their own members, who not only thus escaped guild rules and quality controls (official and guild inspections), but found on site an abundant cheap labor force of men, women, and children, skilled or not. This tendency strengthened in the 18th century, but without calling into question the guild system.

== 19th century ==
The Helvetic Republic abolished in 1798 the obligation to belong to a guild to practice a trade. It loosened the protectionist straitjacket, abolished guild privileges, and, even if it did not want to renounce all rules in this domain, proclaimed freedom of trade and industry in order to create a modern economic order no longer based on status prerogatives. However, this great turning point was only an interlude. In 1803, the cantons of Zurich, Basel, Schaffhausen, and Solothurn reestablished guilds. By contrast, republican freedom was largely maintained in French-speaking Switzerland. The Restoration of 1815 restored the guild system in most cantons, but without giving it back political power. Economic power would escape it during the constitutional reforms of the 1830s, in the cantons of Schaffhausen (1831/1834), Basel-Landschaft (1832), Solothurn (1834), and Zurich (1830/1837), but in Basel-Stadt only in 1874, after recognition of the general freedom of association and the inclusion of freedom of trade in the Federal Constitution.

Certain guilds have been maintained in the form of friendly and charitable societies, or as prestige clubs still playing an important role, as seen at the Sechseläuten in Zurich. The disappearance of the guild system made the fortune of entrepreneurs established in villages and towns, active mainly in textiles. But it also led to the pauperization of many workers, left to the play of supply and demand. It was no longer only, as in the Verlagssystem, spinners and weavers who suffered from low wages. Professional training, formerly a central task of guilds, was assumed by new specialized schools, although companies continued to train apprentices. Municipal and cantonal professional associations, the Swiss Union of Arts and Crafts (1879), and other institutions took over in the second half of the 19th century the functions of guilds in representing craftsmen's interests and defending their ideas on the political level.

== See also ==
- History of craftmanship in Switzerland
- Guild cities

== Bibliography ==
- Ammann, H. "Das schweizerische Städtewesen des Mittelalters in seiner wirtschaftlichen und sozialen Ausprägung", in Recueils de la société Jean Bodin, 7, 1956, 483-529
- Morf, H. Zunftverfassung und Obrigkeit in Zürich von Waldmann bis Zwingli, 1969
- Wesoly, K. "Der weibliche Bevölkerungsanteil in spätmittelalterlichen und frühneuzeitlichen Städten und die Betätigung von Frauen im zünftigen Handwerk", in ZGO, 89, 1980, 69-117
- Füglister, H. Handwerksregiment, 1981
- de Capitani, F. Adel, Bürger und Zünfte im Bern des 15. Jahrhunderts, 1982
- Dubler, A.-M. Handwerk, Gewerbe und Zunft in Stadt und Landschaft Luzern, 1982
- de Capitani, F. Die Berner Zunft zum Mittellöwen von der Reformation zur Revolution, 1985
- Schulz, K. Handwerksgesellen und Lohnarbeiter, 1985
- Simon-Muscheid, K. Basler Handwerkszünfte im Spätmittelalter, 1988
- Piuz, A.-M., Mottu-Weber, L. L'économie genevoise, de la Réforme à la fin de l'Ancien Régime, 1990
- Reininghaus, W. Gewerbe in der frühen Neuzeit, 1990
- Bräuer, H. "Einige Grundzüge der mitteleuropäischen Zunfthandwerksgeschichte", in Handwerk zwischen Idealbild und Wirklichkeit, ed. P. Hugger, 1991, 15-35
- Histoire de l'artisanat, 1993
- Lambrechts, P., Sosson, J.-P., ed. Les métiers au Moyen Age, 1994
- Harzenmoser, M. and T. Zünfte und Gesellschaften in der Stadt Schaffhausen, 1995
- von Moos, A. Zünfte und Regiment, 1995
- Egger, F. Zünfte und Gesellschaften in Basel, 2005
