= Constaffel =

Guild in Zurich, established 1336

Coat of arms of the Constaffel

The Constaffel (or Konstaffel) was an institution of the upper class in Zurich, comparable to the Achtburger in Basel. In 1336, Rudolf Brun united members of Zurich's urban upper class into the Constaffel during the Brun's guild revolution. The old upper class, which had previously governed without guilds, as well as the new Constaffel, consisted of nobles and knights, rentiers, and wealthy merchants.

Today, it exists in the form of the social association Gesellschaft zur Konstaffel, which takes part in Sechseläuten.

In legal texts more broadly, the term Konstaffel refers to the residents of a castle, city, or city quarter. While the term was used in various cities including Strasbourg, where it also designated a constitutionally relevant institution of the upper class, the Constaffel was particularly significant in Zurich's political history.

== Early structure ==
Initially, the Constaffel was a personal association from which Brun appointed thirteen members of the council through cooptation. In the biannual council, an equal number of guild masters (Scabini) faced them. The Constaffel had no internal constitution and, as in Strasbourg, was composed of members from various drinking rooms (Trinkstuben) of the upper class.

In 1348, the Society of Nobles (Gesellschaft der Edelleute), which belonged to the Constaffel, built the Haus zum Rüden, which served as the city hall until 1401 and functioned as the Constaffel's assembly house. The Constaffel gained further definition in 1417 with the founding of the Gemeine Konstaffel (Common Constaffel), a fraternal institution with military, charitable, and ecclesiastical-religious purposes. After the Reformation, its treasury continued to exist as the Konstaffelgut.

== Decline and consolidation ==
At the end of the 14th century, the Constaffel began to lose significance due to emigration, social decline, and the biological extinction of leading families, reaching its lowest point during the Old Zurich War. Consolidation occurred after the Waldmann affair in 1489. With the Fourth Oath Letter of 1489, the Constaffel obtained the status of a political guild. In 1490, by council decree, it was required to admit all men and women in the city without guild rights into the so-called Gemeine Konstaffel, including residents (Hintersassen) and the marginal population of the Kratzquartier (including minstrels, female beggars, and brothel keepers).

After the Reformation, the late medieval drinking room society of the Constaffel became the closed Noble Society zum Rüden (Adelige Gesellschaft zum Rüden), which was dissolved in 1878. After 1600, the Noble Society no longer accepted new full members from guild families, but granted them conditional membership as so-called Stubenhitzer (contributors to the maintenance costs of the Rüden). However, through a new division of the Constaffel, the so-called Bürgerliche Konstaffel (Bourgeois Constaffel), the Stubenhitzer gained access to the council seats of the Constaffel.

== Dissolution and modern continuation ==
The Constaffel was dissolved in 1798 but was restored in 1803 and 1815 as one of thirteen cantonal and municipal electoral guilds, respectively (dissolved in 1838 and 1866). From the official electoral guilds grew so-called guild societies with social purposes. As such, the Constaffel constituted itself in 1841 as the Constaffel Society (Gesellschaft zur Konstaffel). Its association purpose consists of participating in the Sechseläuten in Zurich.
