= Felix Schmid =

Mayor of Zürich (1454–1524)

- Born: 1454; Zürich, Switzerland
- Died: 13 June 1524 (aged 69–70); Zürich, Switzerland
- Occupations: Merchant, magistrate, military commander

Felix Schmid (1454 – 13 June 1524) was a merchant and magistrate who served as mayor of Zürich. He commanded Zürich troops in several campaigns and supported the introduction of the Reformation.

== Biography ==
Schmid was the son of Jakob and held the rank of Junker. He married Margaretha Dachselhofer, daughter of Hans, a guild master. A merchant by profession, he represented the Meisen guild in the Grand Council of Zürich from 1489 and served as guild master from 1489 to 1511.

Schmid was bailiff of Kyburg (1505–1507) and mayor of Zürich from 1511 until his death. He commanded the Zürich troops in the Swabian War in 1499 and at Novara in 1513. In agreement with Zwingli on the prohibition of foreign pensions, he supported him and welcomed the Reformation.

== Bibliography ==
- W. Jacob, Politische Führungsschicht und Reformation, 1970, 240–241
