= Day laborers in Switzerland =

Day laborers (Note: German: Taglöhner; French: Journaliers; Italian: Giornalieri) in Switzerland were workers hired and paid by the day. In the 19th and 20th centuries, this type of employment became restricted to agriculture, but in the pre-industrial era it was common in both urban and rural areas.

== Middle Ages and early modern period ==
Day laborers occupied an inferior position in society as wage earners. In cities, they belonged to the lower classes and constituted one of the main groups alongside domestic workers. Politically, most did not enjoy citizenship rights but only resident status. Unlike artisans who managed family businesses, day laborers were dependent workers. They generally lived with their families in sublet housing. In contrast to masters and journeymen in organized trades, they did not acquire formal training and were thus classified as unskilled workers.

During the Late Middle Ages, day laborers as such had neither professional organizations nor confraternities. However, in certain trades and services, they were admitted to guilds and could thus participate in political life in cities with corporatist regimes. In the fields of transport and agriculture, particularly in horticulture and viticulture, there existed "servant guilds" (Knechtezünfte). In Basel, day laborers employed in viticulture were affiliated with the half-guild of Winegrowers (joined to that of Wool Weavers, then a full guild from 1453), and those in horticulture were united with other trades in the Gardeners' guild (in 1429, 15% of the dependent working population belonged to one or the other). Wine porters, considered "servants," nevertheless belonged to the privileged Coopers' guild. In Zurich, wine criers (who announced sales specifying price and location) and wine transporters were members of the Meisen guild, while carters and porters belonged to the Boatmen's guild.

During periods of economic crisis or shortage of orders, artisans and members of their families were sometimes temporarily forced to work as day laborers to secure income. There were also women among day laborers, particularly in agriculture, viticulture and horticulture (for example on the estates of the hospitals of Geneva and Basel), in road construction and maintenance, as laundresses, as well as children, who were paid the lowest rates yet relied upon by their families. In cities, day laborers were recruited partly from the rural population of the surroundings. This was the case, for example, for women working in Geneva's early modern textile industry (silk production, calico printing) or for wool combers hired in Zurich in the 17th and 18th centuries, who came from rural communes where home spinning was widespread; this workforce traveled to the city daily or stayed there during the week. Intensive agriculture employed itinerant workers especially during peak season.

For day laborers, life was characterized by irregular periods of employment with changing employers, seasonal hiring (especially in construction, horticulture and agriculture), high geographical mobility, and low wages, paid partly in the form of food and/or lodging. Work hours were longer (and thus better paid) in summer than in winter, according to the length of daylight. The 16th century saw stagnation in nominal wages while wheat prices continually increased (doubling or even tripling), particularly in the second half of the century, resulting in a decline in living standards that could lead to poverty.

== 19th and 20th centuries ==
In the 19th and 20th centuries, most day laborers worked in the agricultural sector, which reported 45,000 (including one-fifth women) in the censuses of 1888 and 1900. In an agriculture dominated by family farms, they were approximately half as numerous as domestic servants. They were hired as needed especially on medium-sized farms, while large estates employed permanent domestic servants. Their numbers declined rapidly in the 20th century: in 1930, nearly 15,000 were still counted; by 1970 they numbered fewer than 1,000 according to population censuses. Higher figures appear in enterprise censuses because these take place in summer; for example, 34,000 occasional workers not part of the family were counted in 1929, including 10,000 women and 3,000 children under 15, and still 20,000 in 1969.

These official figures provide only a partial view of reality, as they only account for people who indicated day laborer as their main occupation (persons hired for seasonal agricultural work and, in the interval, frequently employed by communes for forest or road maintenance; this allowed them to support a family, provided the wife cultivated a small plot providing vegetables and potatoes). Additional categories included artisans or young people who worked by the day for a farmer during seasonal peaks (vineyard plowing, haymaking, harvests, grain threshing, agricultural work); small farmers performing occasional tasks for large farmers (winter logging, for example); mountain farmers descending to the plains as itinerant workers, such as the haymakers from Muotathal who traveled to the Zurich countryside. It also happened that, in the off-season, farmers worked as day laborers for contractors, for example to carry out transport work. Finally, daily wage work also existed outside the primary sector, particularly for women.

Mechanization, accelerated by the rural exodus attracted to industrial employment, made day labor largely superfluous. In modern agriculture, it persists for certain partially mechanized tasks and for fruit and berry harvesting in specialized farms. It often provides supplementary income for housewives. The term day laborer, which has long had negative connotations, is hardly used anymore except ironically; its German equivalent nevertheless tends to reappear in classified ads (people offering their services for moves, cleaning).

== Bibliography ==
- H. Hon-Firnberg, Lohnarbeiter und freie Lohnarbeit im Mittelalter und zu Beginn der Neuzeit, 1935 (reprint 1978)
- U. Dirlmeier, Untersuchungen zu Einkommensverhältnissen und Lebenshaltungskosten in oberdeutschen Städten des Spätmittelalters, 1978
- M. Lemmenmeier, Luzerns Landwirtschaft im Umbruch, 1983
- A.-M. Piuz, A Genève et autour de Genève aux XVIIe et XVIIIe s., 1985
- K. Schulz, Handwerksgesellen und Lohnarbeiter, 1985
- D. Rippmann, K. Simon-Muscheid, "Weibliche Lebensformen und Arbeitszusammenhänge im Spätmittelalter und in der frühen Neuzeit", in Frauen und Öffentlichkeit, ed. M. Othenin-Girard et al., 1991, pp. 63–98
- U. Pfister, Die Zürcher Fabriques, 1992
- D. Rippmann, K. Simon-Muscheid, "Quellen aus dem Basler Heilig-Geist-Spital", in Quellen zur europäischen Spitalgeschichte in Mittelalter und Früher Neuzeit, ed. M. Scheutz et al., 2010, pp. 351-422
