= Rudolf Brun =

Leader of the Zürich guilds' revolution of 1336 and mayor of Zürich (c. 1290s–1360)

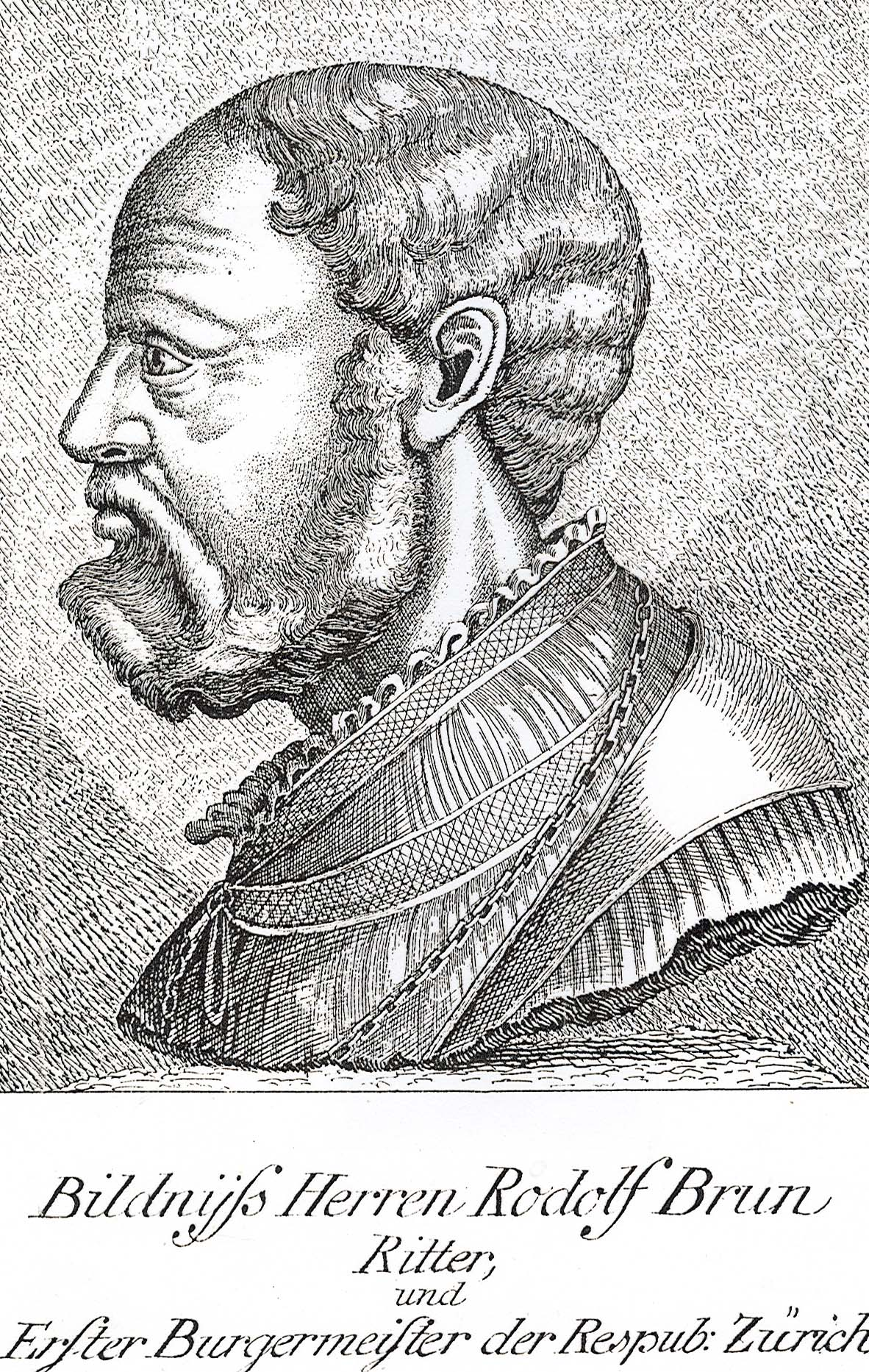
- Born: 1290
- Died: 17 September 1360 (aged 69–70); Zürich

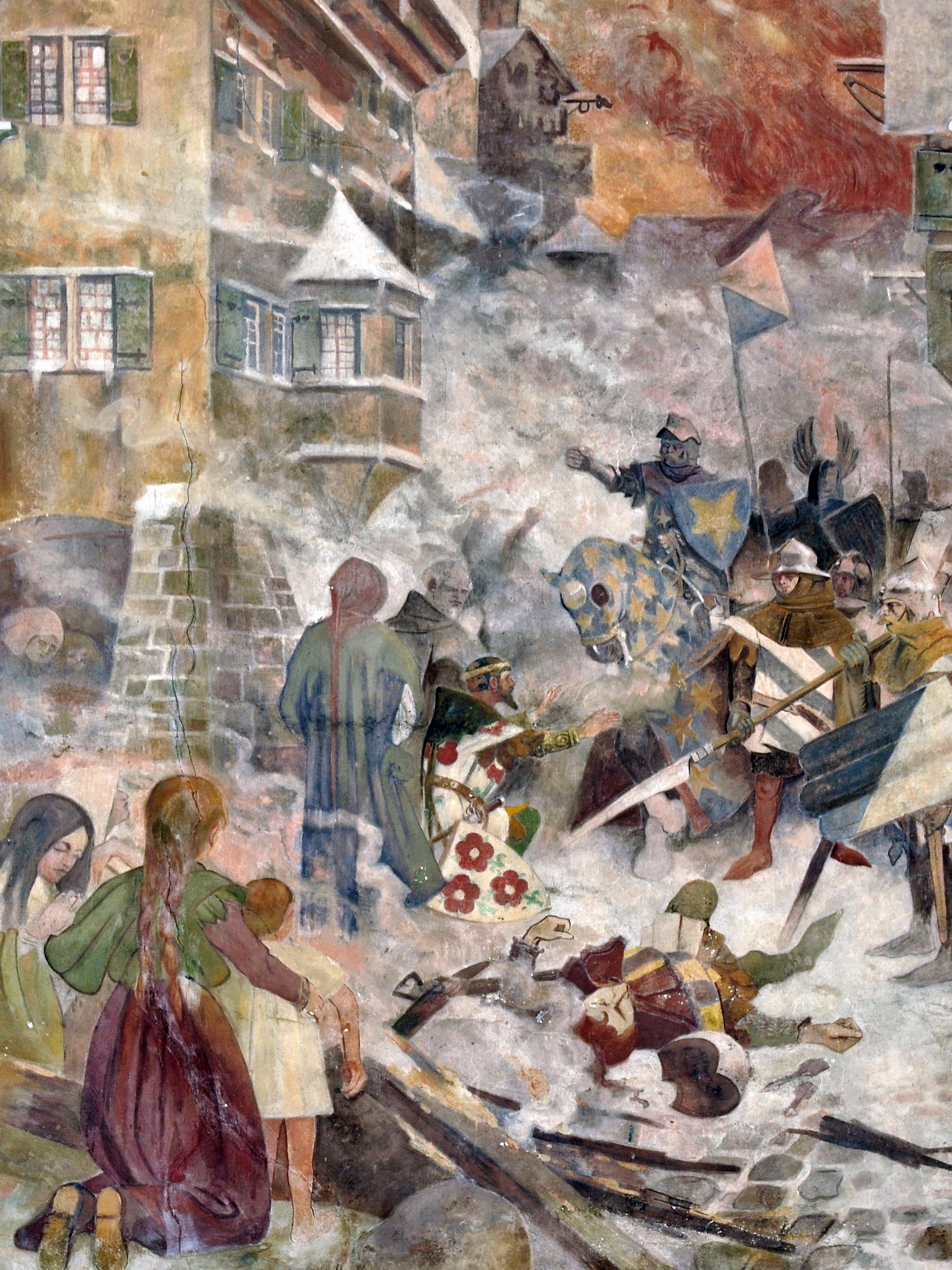
Rudolph Brun, banishing the citizens of Rapperswil, Christmas 1350. Wall painting on Curti house in Rapperswil.

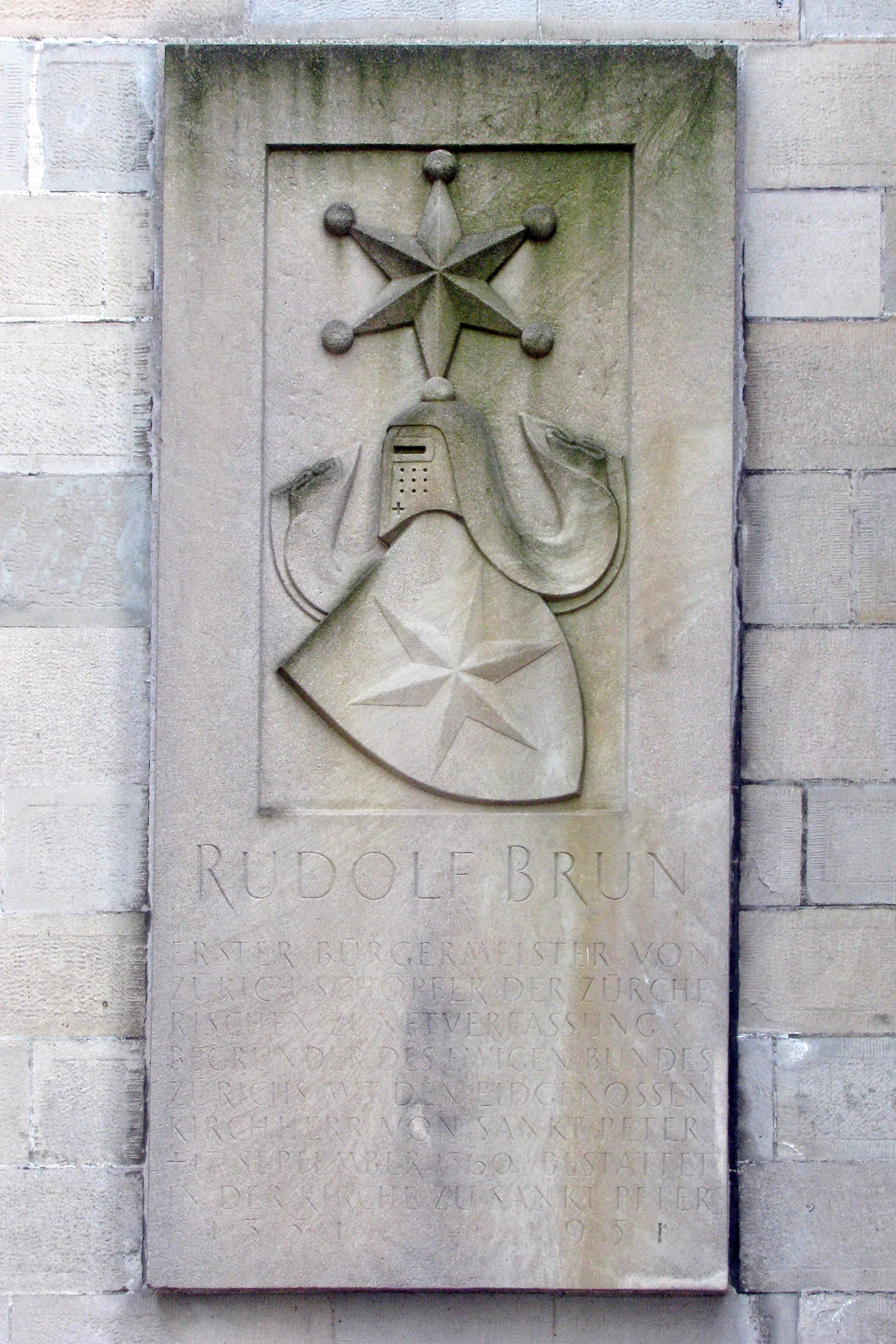
Brun's tombstone, St. Peter church in Zürich

Rudolf Brun (1290s – 17 September 1360) was the leader of the Zürich guilds' revolution of 1336, and the city's first independent mayor.

== Biography ==
Since 1234, Zürich had been governed by an aristocratic council. One third of the council's members were representatives of the nobility, and two-thirds were drawn from the city's patriciate, consisting mainly of influential merchants. The city's mayor was appointed from among these by the abbess of the influential Fraumünster.

Rudolf was the son of Jakob Brun, a member of the city council, and of Mechthild. He was married to Margaretha Fütschi, daughter of Ulrich, another councillor. Rudolf was himself a member of the council from 1332 to 1336.

Brun overthrew the former city council with the help of the city's craftsmen in June 1336. According to the new constitution, the council was now composed of 26 members, of whom 13 were of the Konstaffel, consisting of the former patriciate; at least seven of these were required to hold knighthood. The remaining 13 councillors were the guild masters of the city's 13 guilds (Zünfte). In this sense, Brun's reform was not so much a revolution as the creation of a balance of power between the patriciate and the guilds.

Brun reserved for himself the title of mayor for life, and he dominated the council until his death in 1360.

In 1337, Brun defeated his political opponents, who had retreated to Rapperswil, at the Battle of Grynau. In 1349, Brun led a massacre of the Jewish community of Zurich, seizing many of the spoils for himself. An attempted coup by the aristocratic opposition was forcefully put down in 1350, Count Johann II of Rapperswil, the opposition's leader, was arrested, and the town walls of Rapperswil and Rapperswil Castle were destroyed by Brun. Zürich under Brun joined the Swiss Confederacy in 1351.

A result of Brun's revolution was a decrease of the influence of the city's two monasteries, the Grossmünster and the Fraumünster, which had dominated Zürich throughout the Middle Ages. The Fraumünster abbesses, traditionally women of the highest nobility, did retain considerable political influence, however, and the process was only completed with Huldrych Zwingli's reformation in the 1520s, in the course of which the monasteries were shut down.
