= Hüttenbrennen =

Bonfire custom in parts of Germany

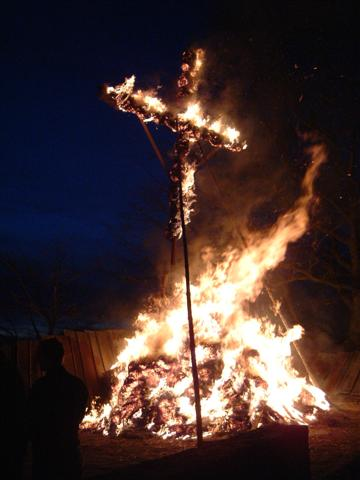
Hüttenbrennen on the Prümerburg in Prümzurlay

Video from the Eifeler Hüttenbrennen (Bonfires)

Hüttenbrennen (lit. "hut burning"), sometimes also referred to as Burgbrennen (lit. "castle burning"), is an old-fashioned bonfire custom in many part of the Eifel mountains in Germany. It is celebrated every year on "Straw Sunday" (German: Schafssonntag, Moselle Franconian: Schoof-, Schoofs-, Schöf-, Schoaf-, Schaufs-, Scheifsunndich or Scheefsunndich, where Scheef means "truss of straw"), the first Sunday after Shrove Tuesday (Carnival Day or Fastnacht), also observed as Funkensonntag.

== Course of events ==
Hüttenbrennen is celebrated differently in each Eifel town. What all places have in common is that the village youth - mostly male - collect straw and other combustible materials. In most villages, the material is collected only on Sundays, but some of them also collect the brushwood from nearby spruce forests many weeks in advance. These are then collected into a stacked pile, usually on an eminence, which is lit after nightfall. In many places, the burning material is also topped by a wooden cross, which is also decorated with straw etc. In some places, preparations begin on the Saturday.

In some places, such as Gees, Neroth, Steffeln, Walsdorf, Pellingen, Franzenheim (Trier-Saarburg), a wheel of fire is rolled down the mountain, known in Moselle Franconian as Radscheewen, Radscheywen, Radschiwwele or Raderschläle. The wheel represent the life-giving spring sun - and is also known as the wheel of joy.

After the fire, the village youth usually move from house to house to collect a reward for their work. This usually consists of eggs, which are then collected and eaten together in the form of scrambled eggs. Of course, money is also well received. In some places, the fire is also traditionally prepared by the Volunteer Fire Brigade, who then move from house to house to be served. However, there are also places where young people who have recently arrived entertain the other young people, or where only the bachelors are allowed to collect and eat eggs.

In some places of the Eifel it is customary on Straw Sunday evening to feed newlyweds or newcomers to the village with eggs and Nautzen (German: Krapfen i.e. filled doughnuts). In some cases this custom has also been adopted by local restaurants.

== Sequence in pictures ==
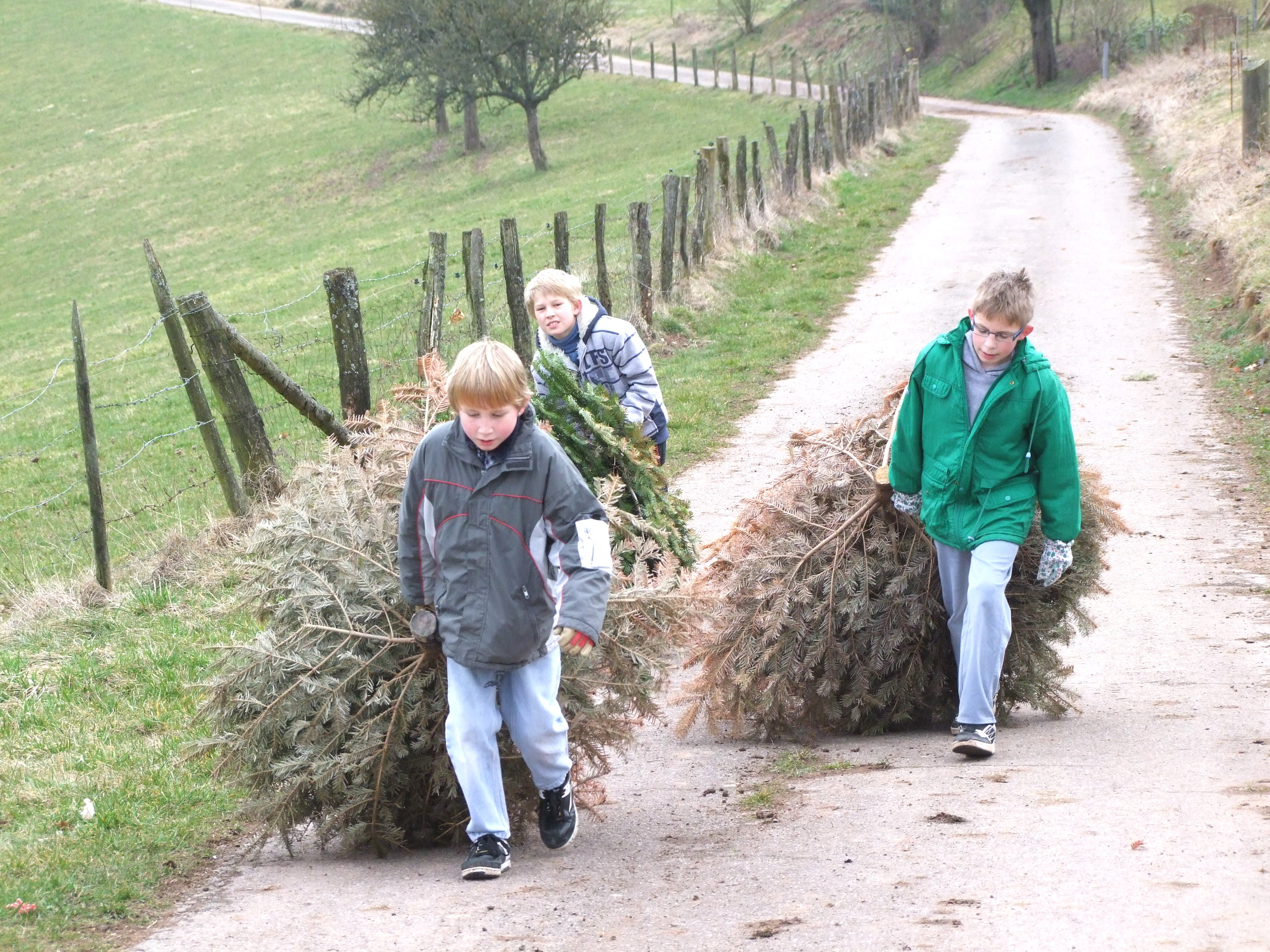
1

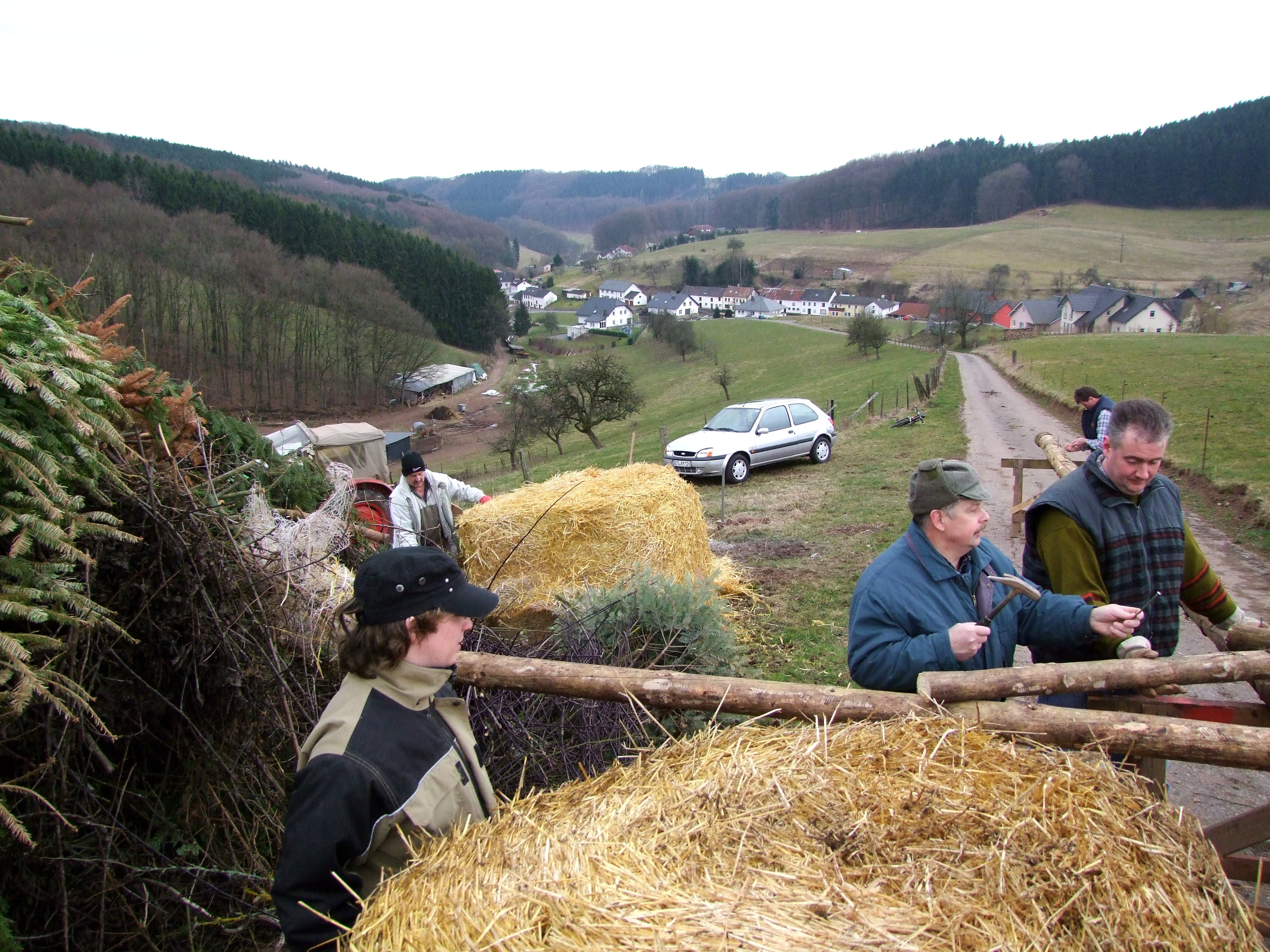
2

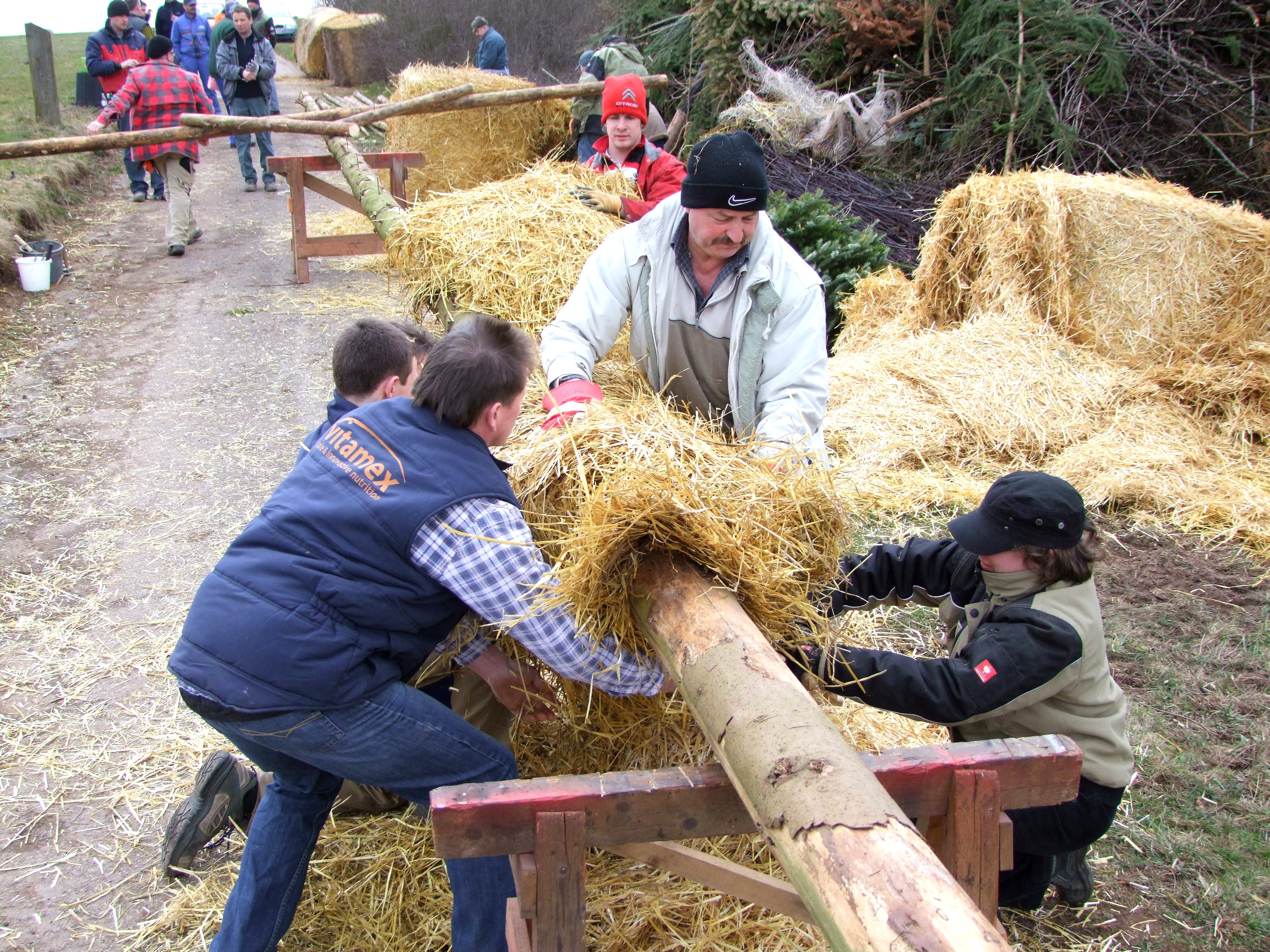
3

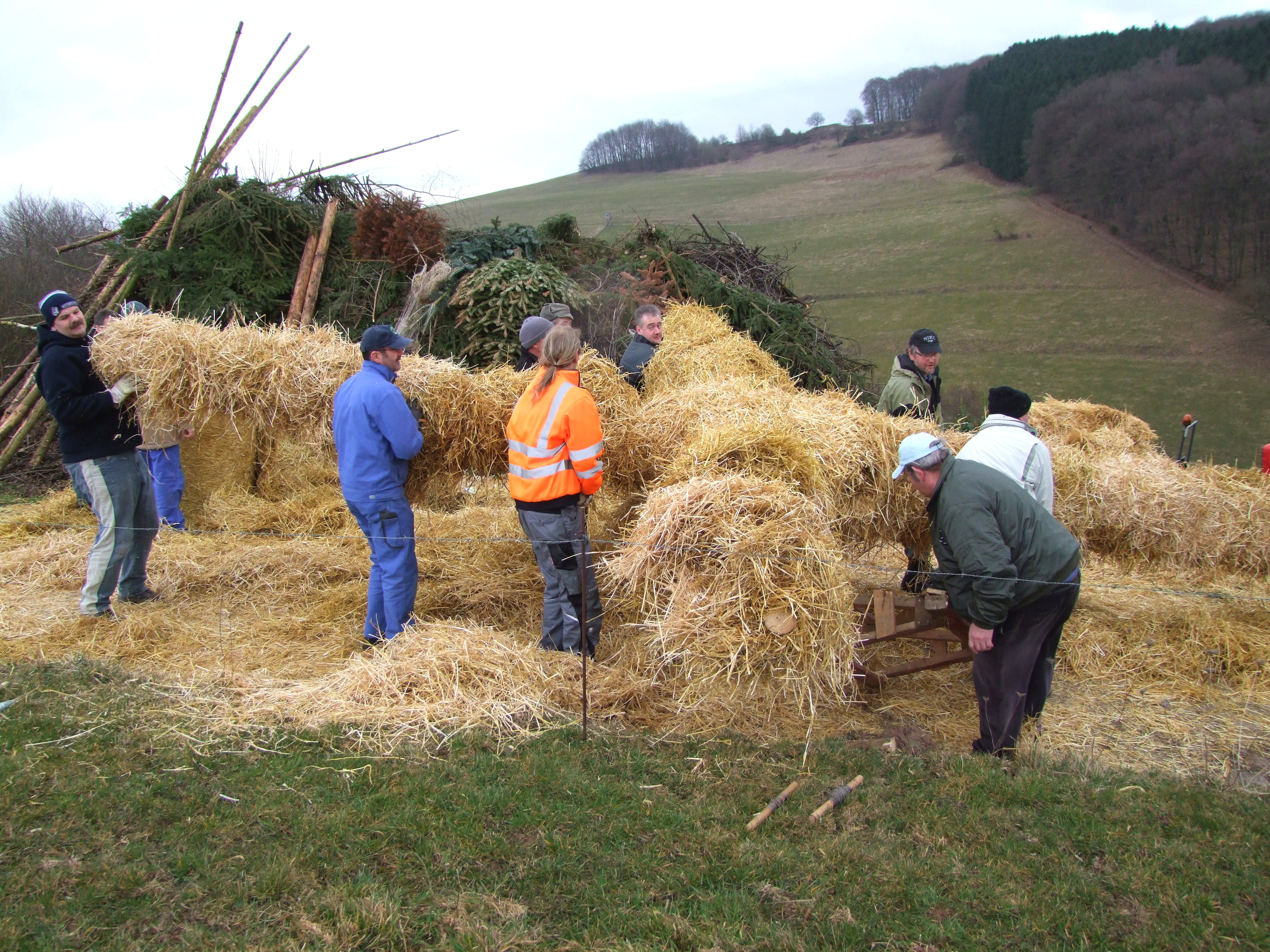
4

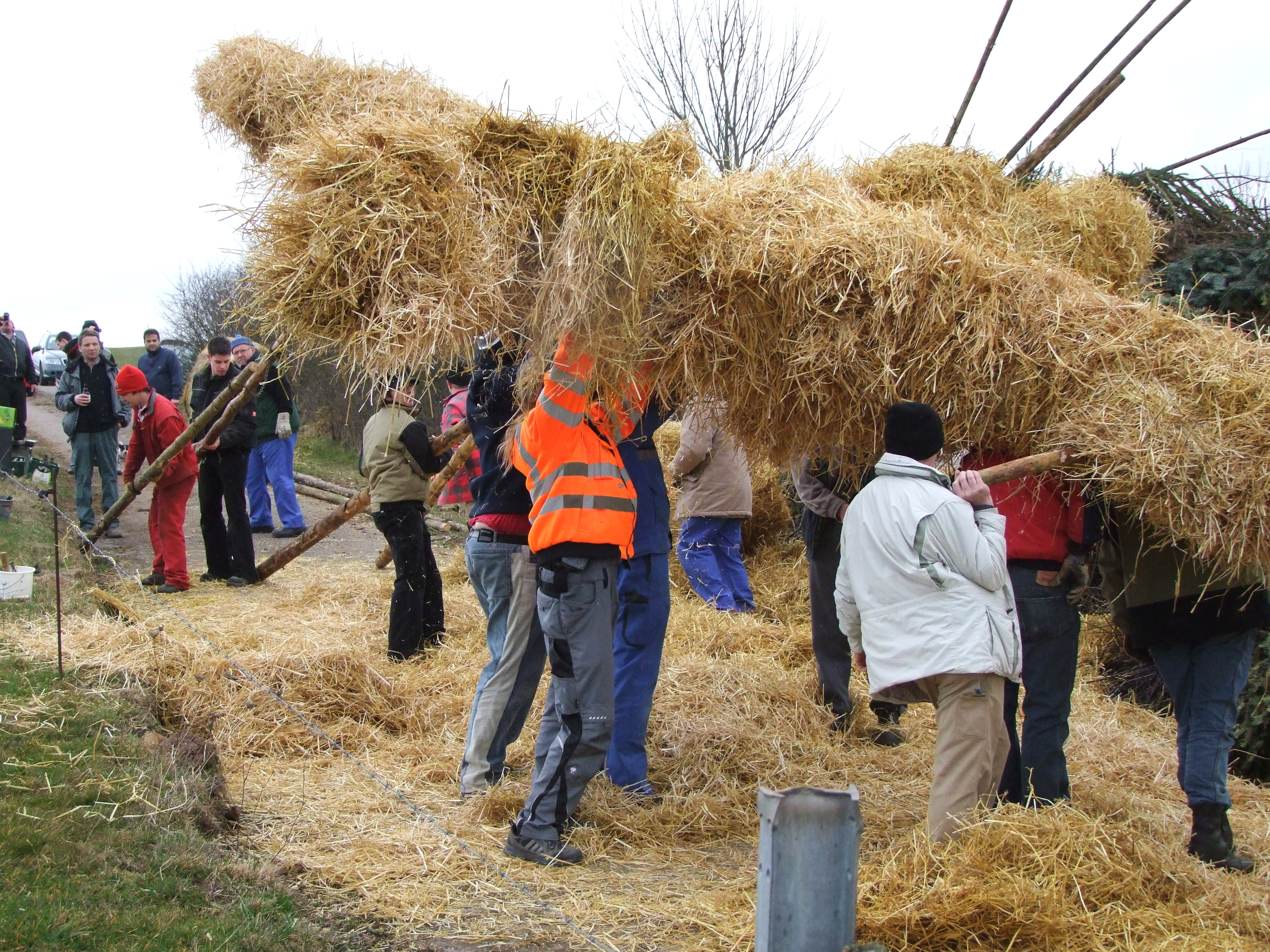
5

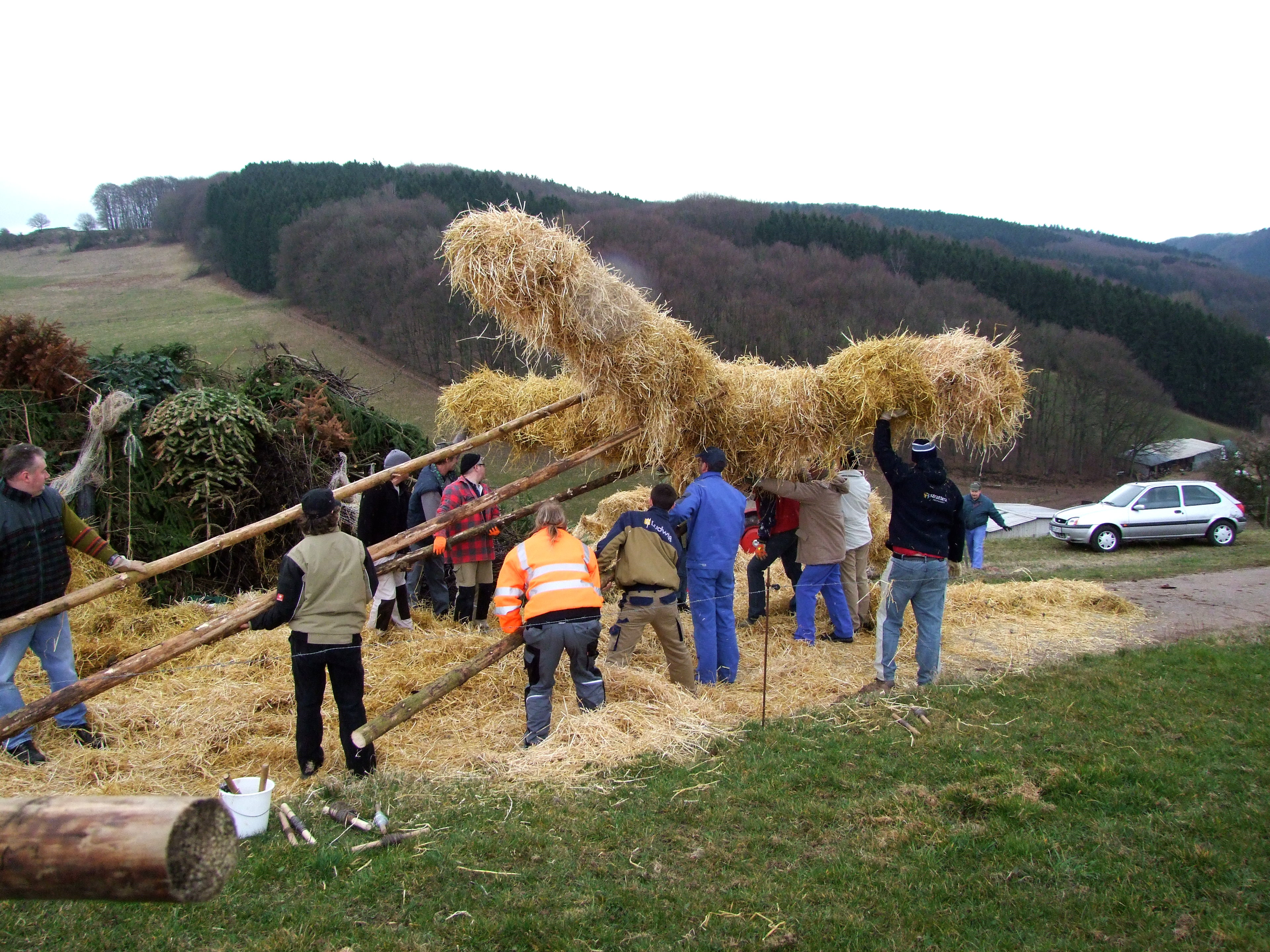
6

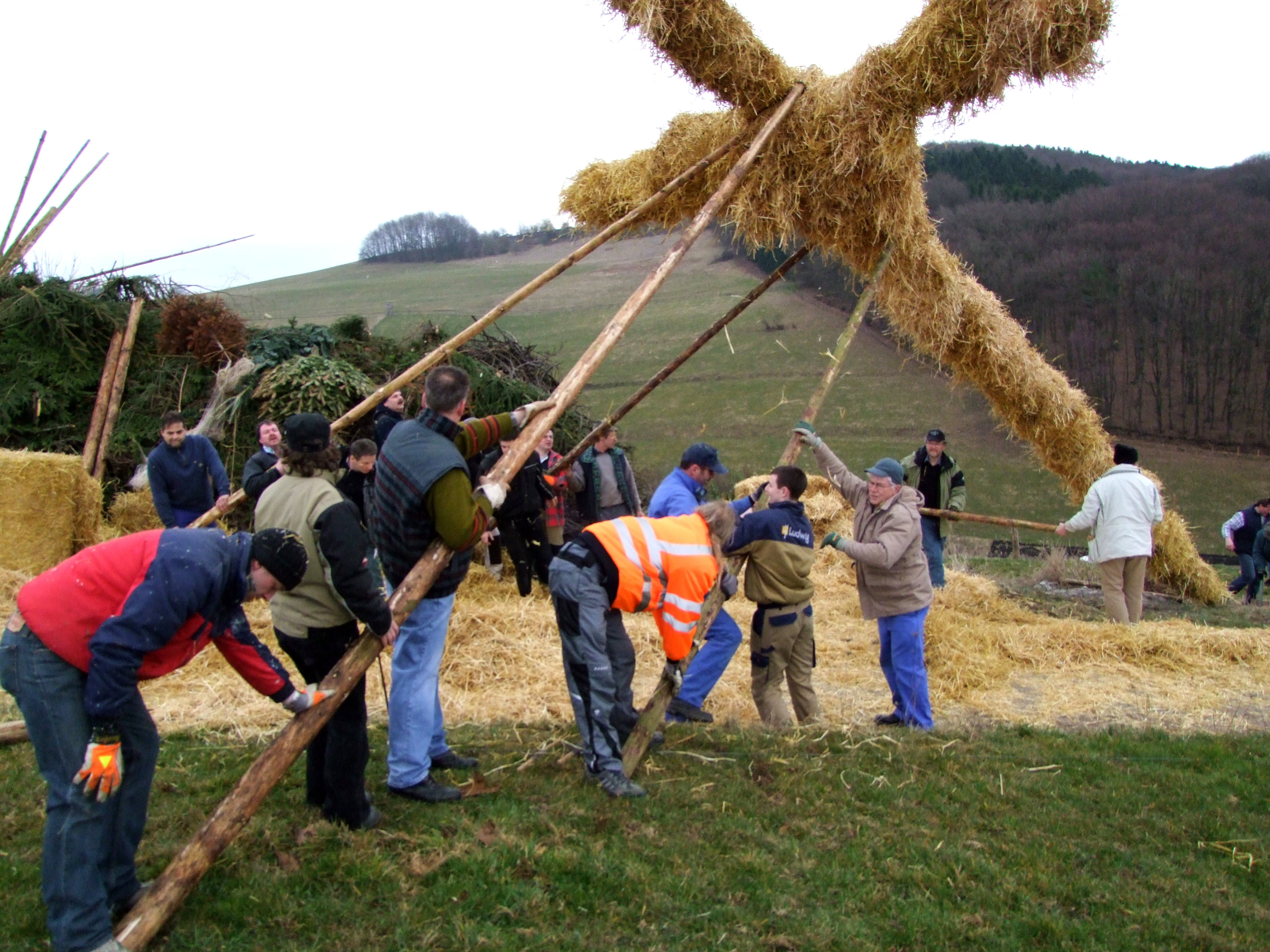
7

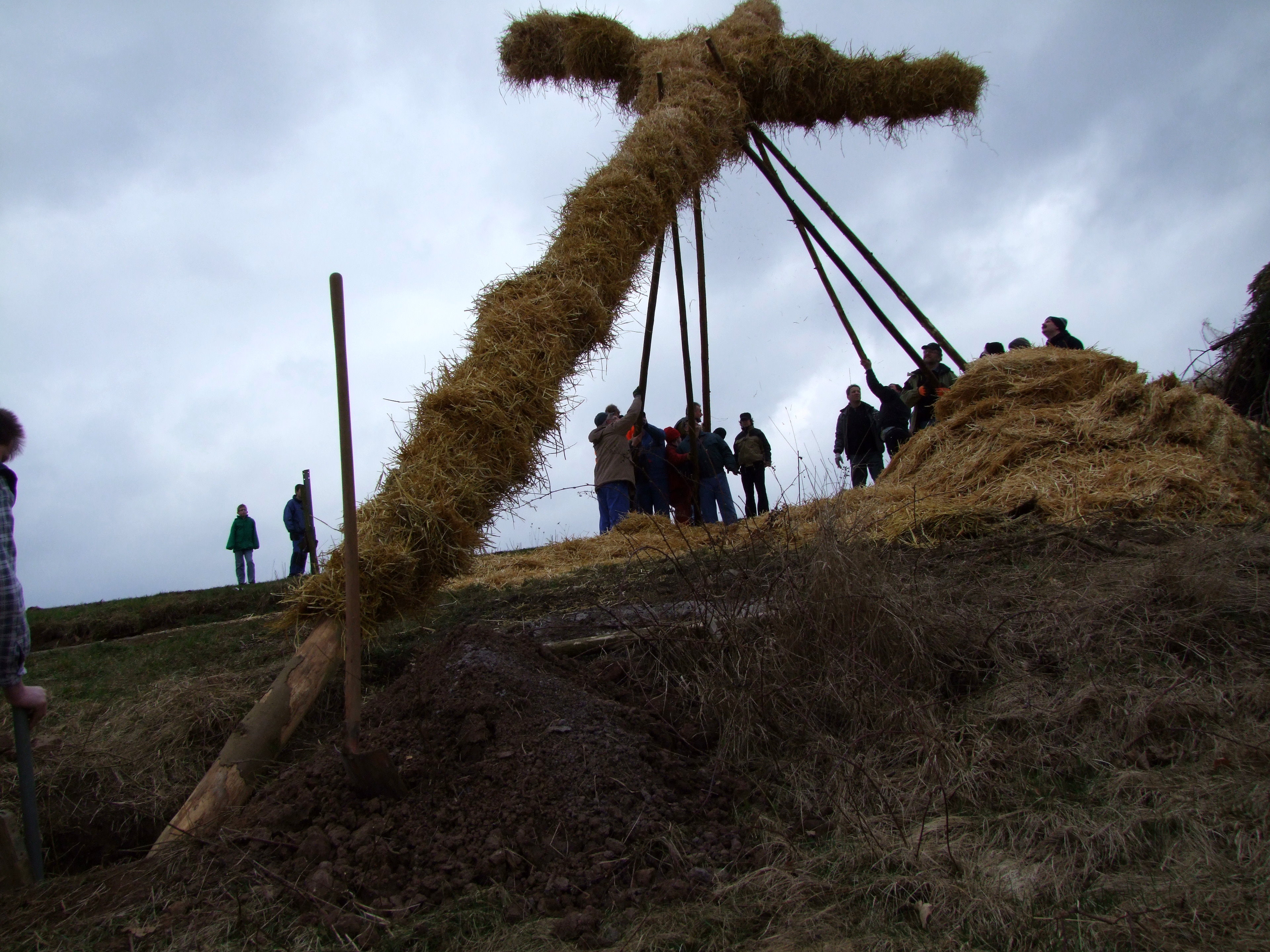
8

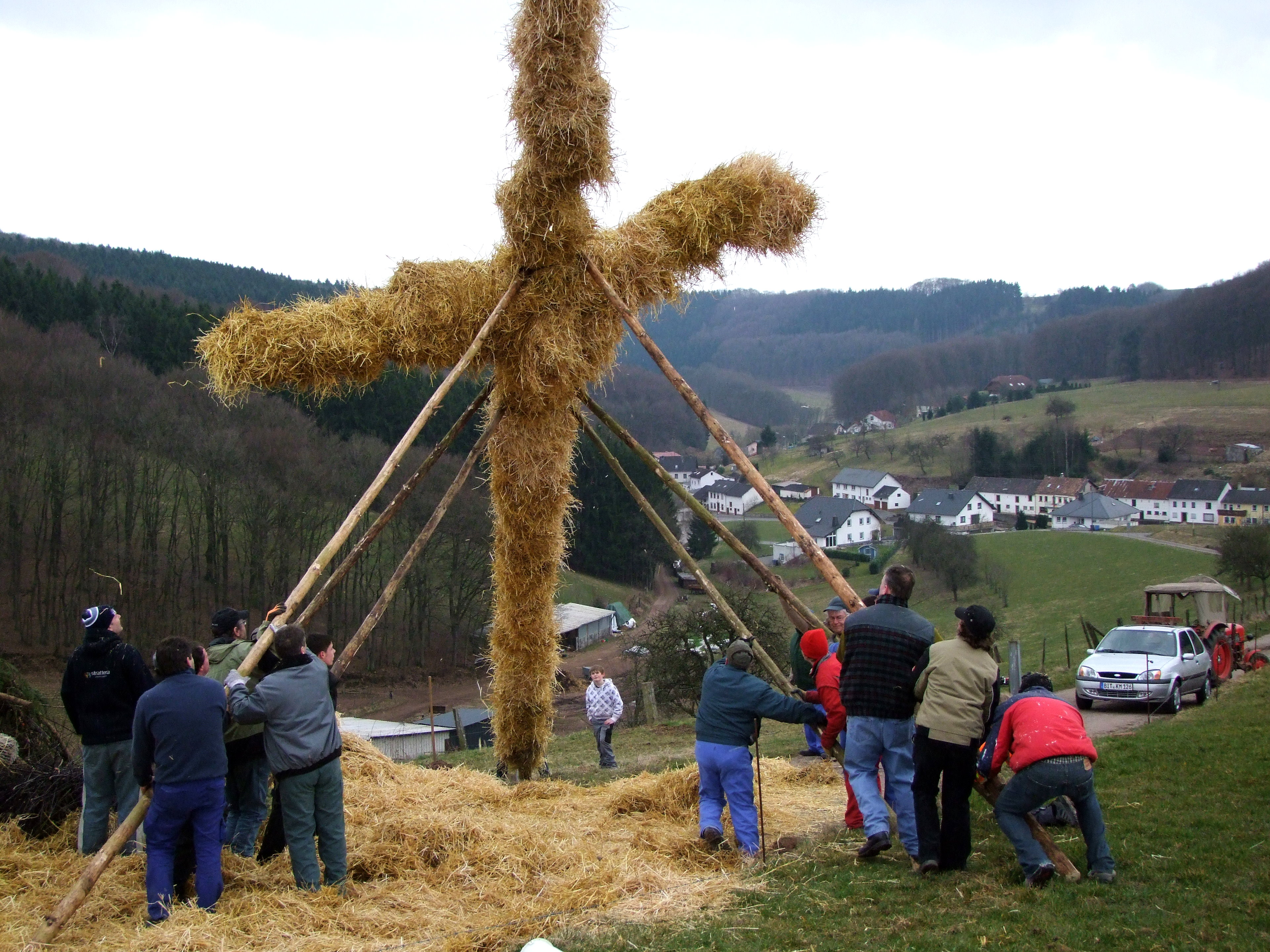
9

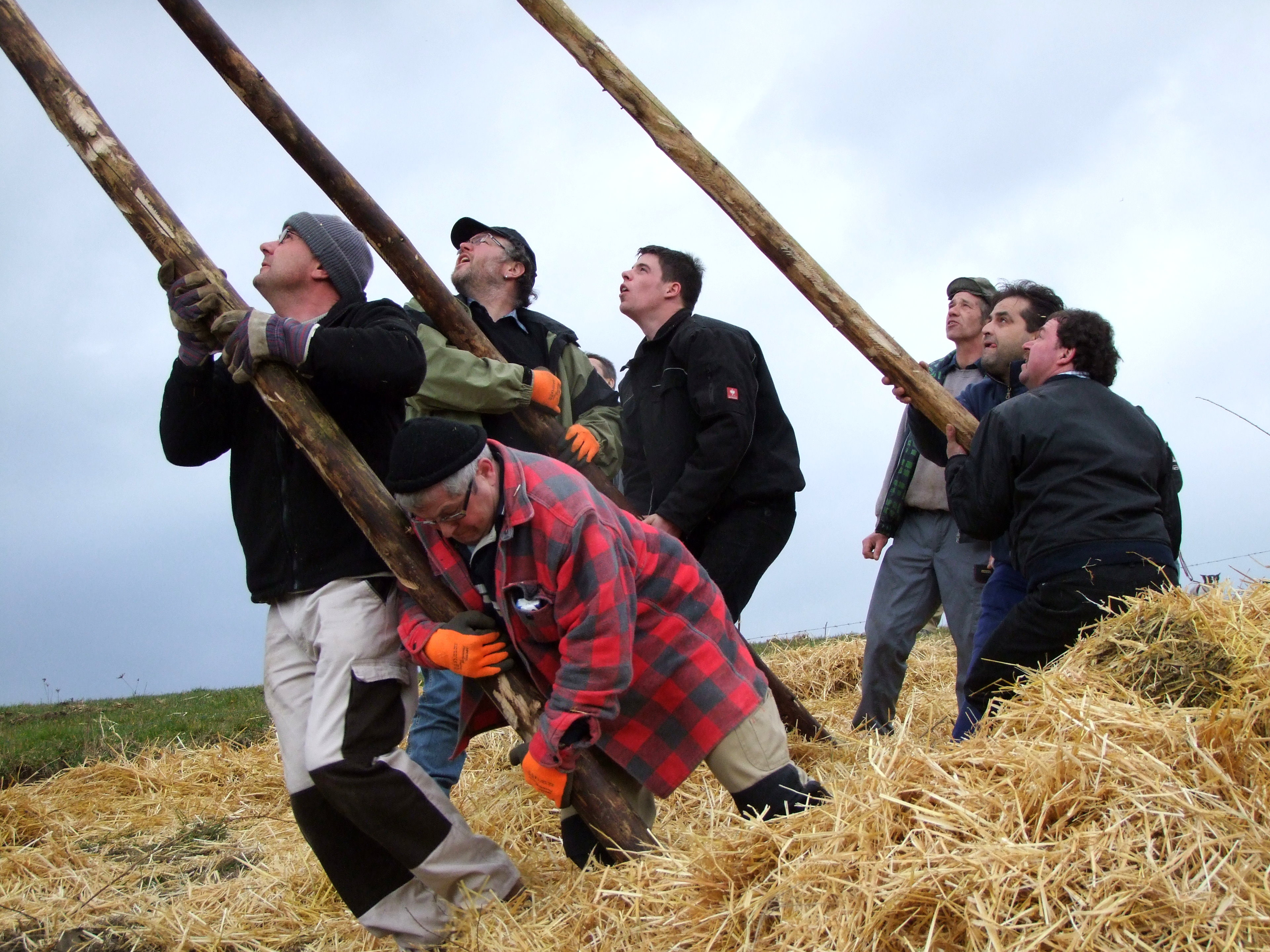
10

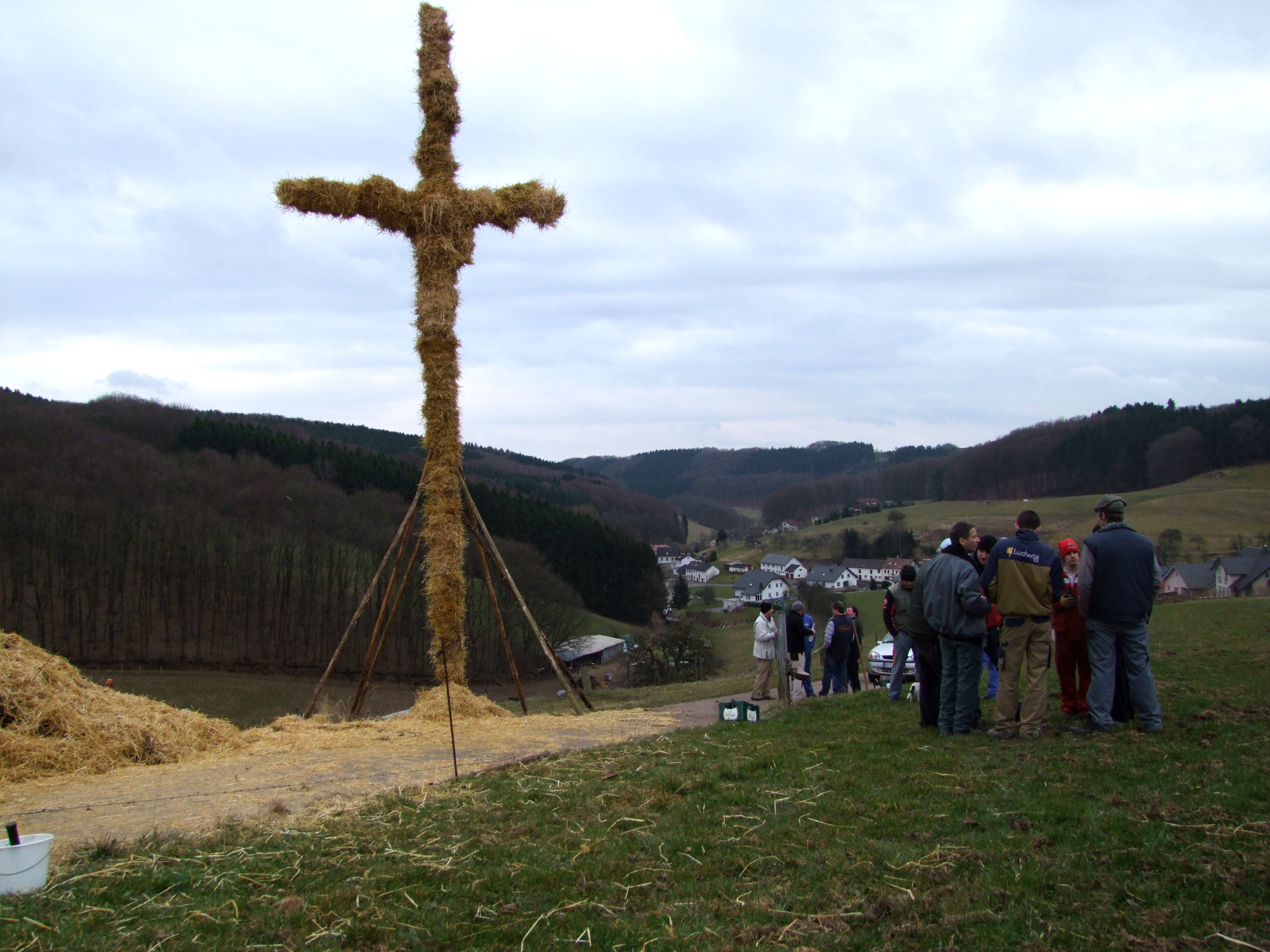
11

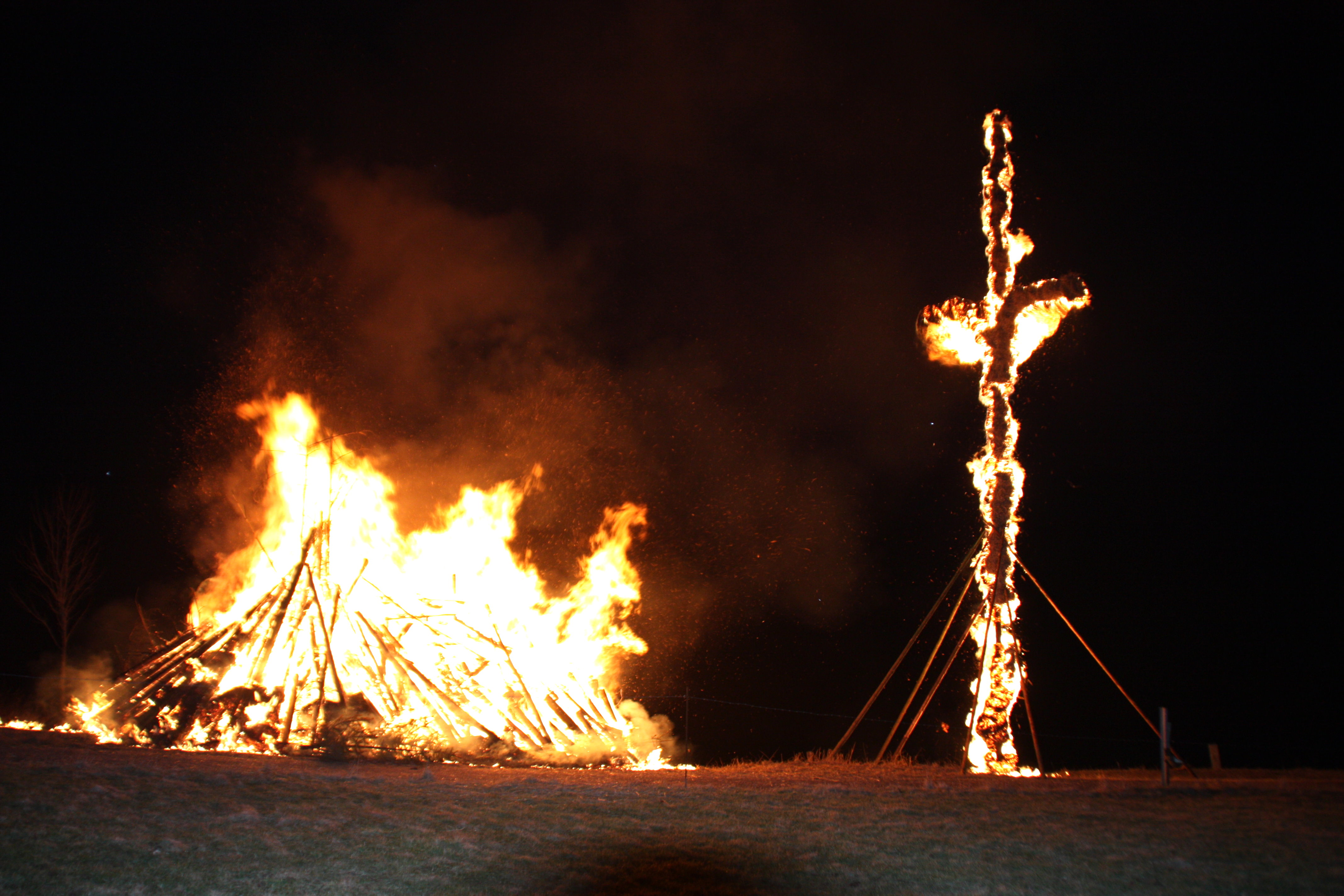
12

== See also ==
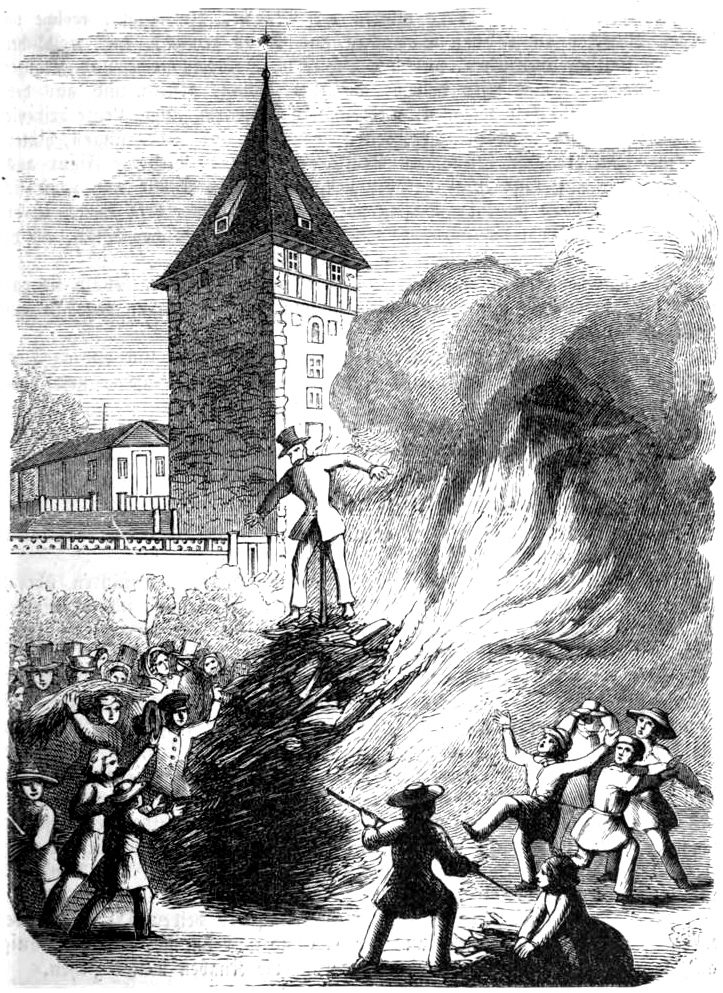
The winter burning. From: Otto von Reinsberg-Düringsfeld, The festive year in customs and festivals of the Germanic peoples, Leipzig, 1863.

- Burgbrennen (very similar custom in Luxembourg)
- Funkenfeuer (similar custom in Swabian-Alemannic area)
- Feuerrad (similar custom in Westphalia, Hesse, Bavaria, Switzerland)
- Osterfeuer (similar German custom at Easter)
- Sechseläuten (similar Swiss custom in Zürich)
- Biikebrennen (similar custom in North Frisia)

== Literatur ==
- Bores, Heinz: Hüttenbrennen. In: Der Heimatbote. - H. 1 (1997), Seite 7–8. - Ill. Vereinsschrift des Heimatvereins Irrel e.V.. – Irrel.
- Buhrke, Heinz-Jürgen: Radschieben in Neroth. In: Nerother Hefte. - 14 (2000), Seite 18–22. - Ill. Hrsg.: Heimatverein Neroth. – Neroth.
- Der Burgsonntag oder Scheefsonntag. Uraltes Brauchtum, das sich über die Jahrhunderte in der Westeifel lebendig erhalten hat. In: Trierische Landeszeitung. - Nr. 1950. 47.
- Dietzen, Inge: Klappern, Jaudesjagen und Eierheischen : alte, neue und bereits vergessene Bräuche in der Karwoche und an Ostern. In: Jahrbuch für den Kreis Cochem-Zell. - (2016), Seite 55–60. - Illustrationen. - (Schwerpunktthema: Sitten und Gebräuche im Jahresablauf). Hrsg.: Kreisverwaltung Cochem-Zell. – Cochem.
- Grasediek, Werner: Vom Steffelberg rollt das Feuerrad. In: Landkreis Daun: Jahrbuch. - (2003), Seite 112–115. - Ill. Hrsg. Kreisverwaltung Daun. – Monschau.
- Heinz, Andreas / 1941-: Eifeler Fasten- und Osterbräuche : Vortrag im Kreismuseum Bitburg-Prüm in Bitburg am 31. März 2006. In: Beiträge zur Geschichte des Bitburger Landes. - 62/63 = 16 [vielm.: 17] (2006), 1/2, S. 42-50. Hrsg.: Geschichtl. Arbeitskreis im VBW Bitburg-Land. – Bitburg.
- Hunz, D und Meyer, A: Radscheywen : ein Brauchtum im Wandel der Zeiten. In: Nerother Hefte. - 5 (1991), Seite 36–42. Hrsg.: Heimatverein Neroth. – Neroth.
- Jung, Mathilde / 1884–1963: Weihnachten und Ostern im Brauchtum der Heimat. In: Pfälzer Diakonissenhaus (Speyer): Pfälzer Diakonissenhauskalender. - 66 (1953)'52, S. 67-71. - Ill.
- Koch, Walter: Das Feuerrad von Pellingen. In: Landkreis Trier-Saarburg: Jahrbuch Kreis Trier-Saarburg. - (2010), Seite 157–159. - Ill. Hrsg. v. d. Kreisverwaltung Trier-Saarburg. – Trier
- Mayer, Alois / 1942-: Hüttensonntag, Scheefsonntag, Feuersonntag. In: Steineberg: Steineberg in Geschichte und Geschichten. - Nr. 4 (1998), Seite 21–23. - Ill.
- Mayer, Alois / 1942-: "Scheef"-Sonntag hat nichts mit "Schieben" zu tun: ein Beitrag zum Eifeler Dialekt. In: Die Eifel. - 87 (1992), Seite 88–91. - Ill.
- Meyer, Norbert: Das Hüttenbrennen am Schaffsonntag. In: Ous der Heemicht. - Nr. 16 = 15 (2005), S. 9. - Ill. Hefte zur Heimatkunde / Verein f. Heimatkunde in d. Verbandsgemeinde Neuerburg e.V. – Neuerburg.
- Schad, Hans-Josef: Burgsonntag. Notwendige Gedanken und Anregungen zu einem alten Brauch. In: Prümer Land. - Jg. 8. 1978. S. 9.
- Schlöder, Bernd: Höttenboom 2005. In: Heana-Blaad. - Ausg. 45 (2005), Seite 6–8. - Ill. [Verbrennen des Hüttenbaumes] . Zeitschrift: Mettericher Heana-Blaad : erste unabhängige Dorfzeitung in Rheinland-Pfalz . Hrsg.: Ortsgemeinde Metterich. – Metterich
- Schmitt, Heinz: Gebt uns Eure Bohnen, Petrus wird es lohnen: ein altes Heischelied aus Oberstadtfeld. In: Landkreis Vulkaneifel: Jahrbuch / Landkreis Vulkaneifel. - (2007), Seite 221–223. Hrsg. Kreisverwaltung Daun. - Monschau
- Schmitz, Heinz: Scheefsondisch (Scheefsonntag) - treu überlieferter Name und Brauch. In: Weidenbach / Herausgeber: Ortsgemeinde Weidenbach ; Redaktion: Heinz Altenhölscher (Weidenbach), Bernhard Dartsch (Weidenbach), Heinz Schmitz (Gerolstein), Gerd Stolz (Landscheid). - Weidenbach : Ortsgemeinde Weidenbach, [2016]. - Seite 397–399. – Illustrationen.
- Scholzen, Reinhard / 1959-: Gemeinsam das Rad schieben. In: Landkreis Vulkaneifel: Jahrbuch / Landkreis Vulkaneifel. - (2017), Seite 71–73. – Illustrationen. Hrsg. Kreisverwaltung Daun. – Monschau.
- Schröder, Joachim: Strohmann, Fackeln und Räder bestimmten den Winteraustrieb : Burgfeuer als ehemaliger Vegetationskult und Wachstumszauber. In: Zwischen Venn und Schneifel. - 31 (1995), Seite 53–55. - Ill. Zeitschrift für Geschichte, Folklore und Kultur. - Brüssel.
- Steffens, Reinhard: Das Feuerrad rollt zu Tale. Altes Brauchtum in Oberstadtfeld gepflegt. In: Heimat-Jahrbuch Kreis Daun Vulkaneifel. 1986. S. 19o-191. 2 Abb..
- Willems, Anton: Das Feuerrad. In: Pellingen: Chronik von Pellingen / [Hrsg.: Ortsgemeinde Pellingen. Autoren: Anton Willems ... ]. Pellingen, [2005]. - S. 719-721. - Ill.
- Zender, Arnold: Kultur, Brauchtum, dörfliches Miteinander : Scheefsunndich und Hüttenbrennen. In: Idenheim: Idemer Dorfzeitung. - Ausg. 5 (2011), Seite 4–6. - Ill. Idemer Dorfzeitung. – Idenheim.
