= Michael Theurillat =

Swiss writer

Michael Theurillat (born 1961) is a Swiss writer of crime fiction.

Born in Basel, he studied business administration, art history and history. In 2000, he quit his job as an executive with the Swiss bank UBS to be able to write full-time.

Theurillat's novels follow the investigations of Kommissar Eschenbach, an investigator with the Zurich police. They have been commercially successful; his third novel, Sechseläuten, was at the head of Swiss bestseller lists following its publication. The Basler Zeitung called him one of Switzerland's most successful crime writers.

In 2011, Der Bund reported that Theurillat had reused, without attribution, text from the Internet encyclopedia Wikipedia in his novel Rütlischwur.

== Works ==
- Im Sommer sterben (2006), ISBN 978-3-546-00374-2
- Eistod (2008), ISBN 978-3-546-00420-6
- Sechseläuten (2009), ISBN 978-3-550-08750-9
- Rütlischwur (2011), ISBN 978-3-550-08840-7
