= Easter fire =

Bonfires lit at Easter as part of liturgical and secular celebrations

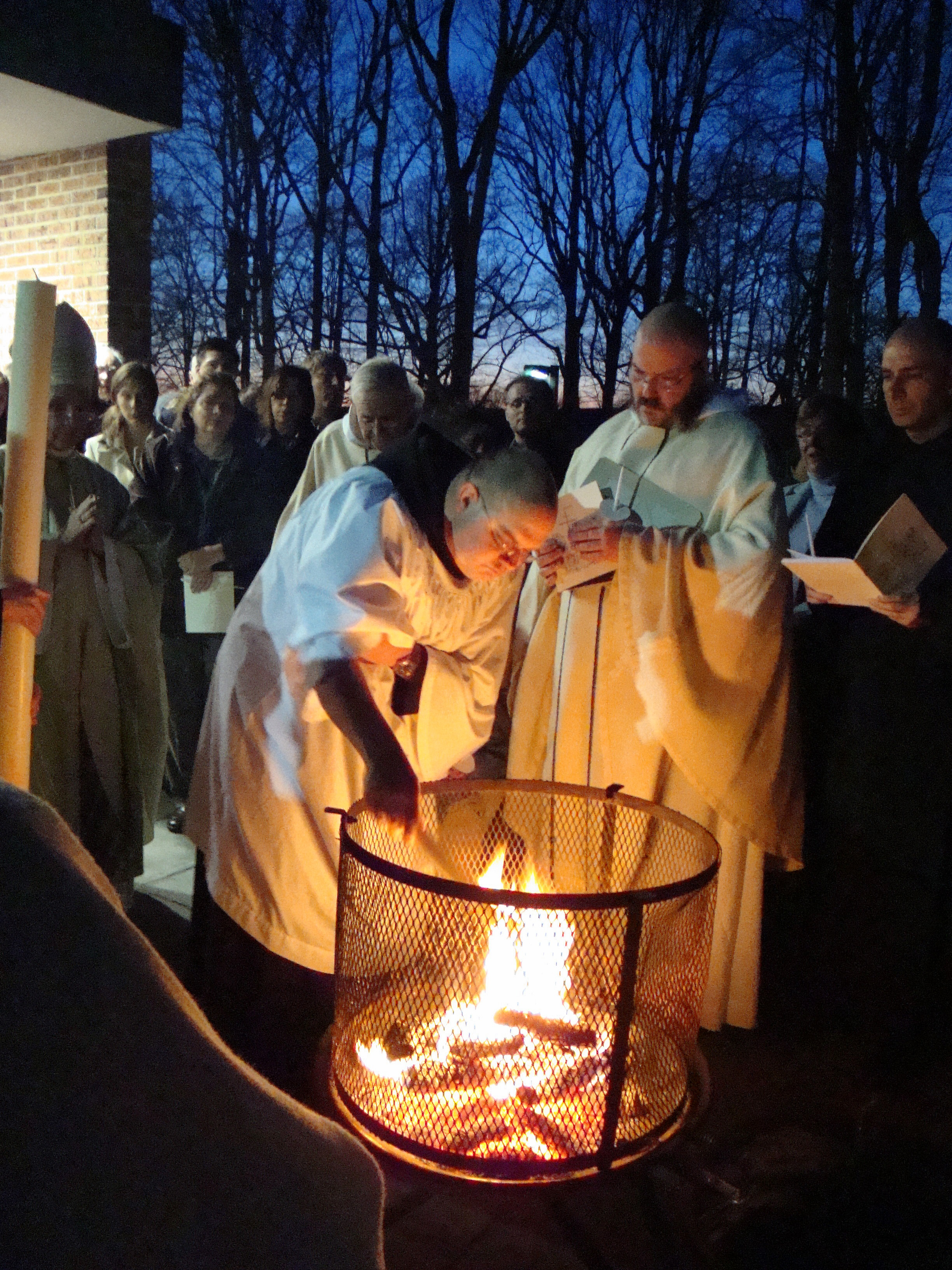
Benedictine monks preparing to light the Christ candle prior to Easter Vigil mass, Morristown, New Jersey

Easter fires, also called Paschal fires, are typically bonfires lit at Easter as part of Christian liturgical and cultural celebrations.

== Christian liturgy ==
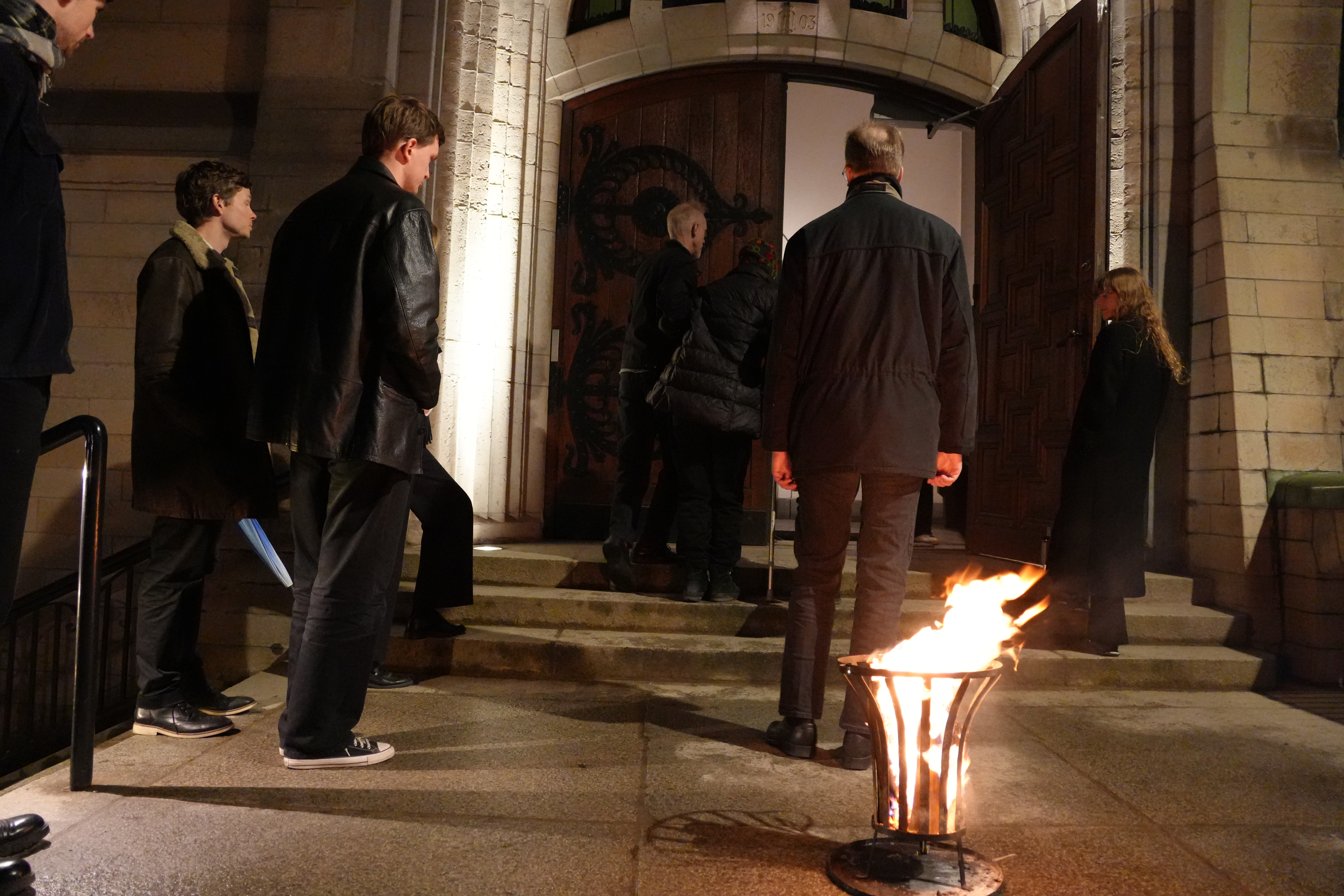
The Easter Fire of St. Matthew's Evangelical-Lutheran Church in Stockholm is seen as people enter the church for the celebration of the Easter Vigil (2026)

Used in solemn Roman Catholic, Lutheran, Reformed, Anglican, and Methodist celebrations of the Easter Vigil held after sunset on Holy Saturday, concluding the Paschal Triduum. Such a fire might be used to light a Paschal candle or other candles used symbolically before or during Mass or other religious celebration.

As a sacrament in remembrance of the Resurrection of Jesus, both the Catholic Mass according to Roman rite and the Evangelical-Lutheran Mass begins with a big celebration of light (Lucernarium): an open fire is lighted outside the church and blessed by the priest; when the Paschal candle is lit, the community ceremoniously enters the dark church chanting Lumen Christi and Deo gratias (or the equivalents of these in the local, vernacular language).

The Easter Vigil liturgies of the Roman Catholic, Lutheran, Anglican, Methodist and Presbyterian Churches are nearly identical.

According to the Eastern Orthodox tradition of the Holy Fire, worshippers light candles from the Paschal trikirion during service at Saturday Midnight, while the troparion is sung.

== Christian folk customs ==
=== German regions ===
Video clip of a large Easter Fire in Hamburg on the Horner Rennbahn (2016)

In Northern Germany, Easter Fires (German: Osterfeuer) are lit around sunset on Holy Saturday.

In some Old Bavarian regions, the Burning of Judas on Holy Saturday is still common.

=== Netherlands ===
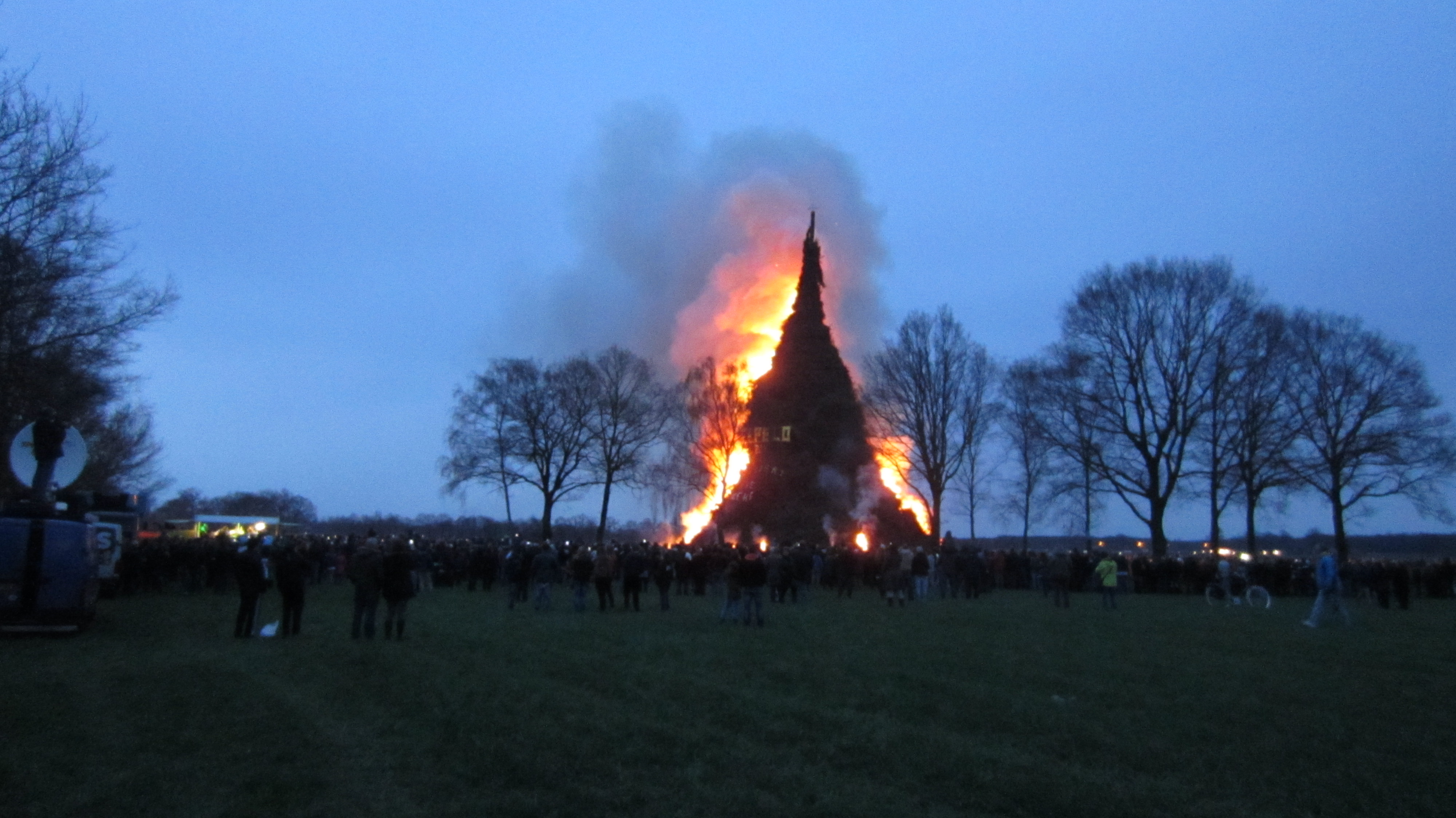
Easter Fire in Twente, height 45.98 metres (150.9 ft)

Easter fires also exist in the Netherlands, in roughly the area where Low Saxon is spoken.

=== USA ===
In Fredericksburg, Texas, each year the residents have Easter Fires the night before Easter, commemorating a peace treaty with the Comanche Indians. In 1847 when the original treaty was signed, the Comanches lit signal fires on the area hills.

=== South Slavs ===
Amongst South Slavs (Serbs, Montenegrins, Slovenes, Croats, Bulgarians, Macedonians, Bunjevci and Šokci), it is required to jump over the flames of Easter (Serbian Cyrillic: Крљавештице, romanized: Krljaveštice).

== See also ==
- Biikebrennen (similar custom in North Frisia)
- Burgbrennen (very similar custom in Luxembourg)
- Chaharshanbe Suri (similar custom in Iran, Azerbaijan, Afghanistan and Tajikistan)
- Funkenfeuer (similar custom in Swabian-Alemannic area)
- Holy Fire
- Hüttenbrennen (similar custom in the Eifel)
- Luminaria (vigil fire)
- Sechseläuten (similar Swiss custom in Zürich)
- Victimae paschali laudes
