= Biikebrennen =

Annual bonfire night

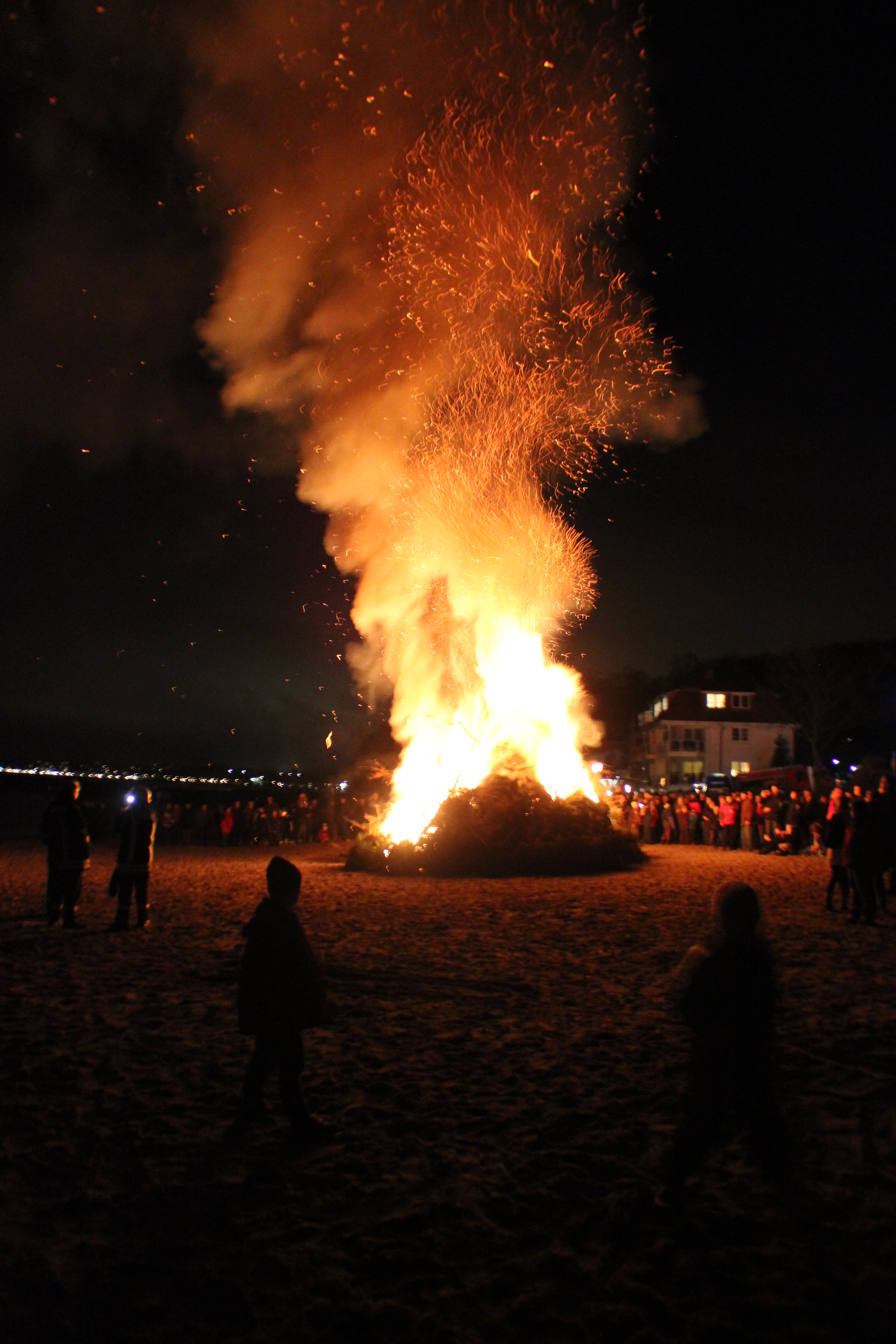
Biikebrennen in Flensburg (2014)

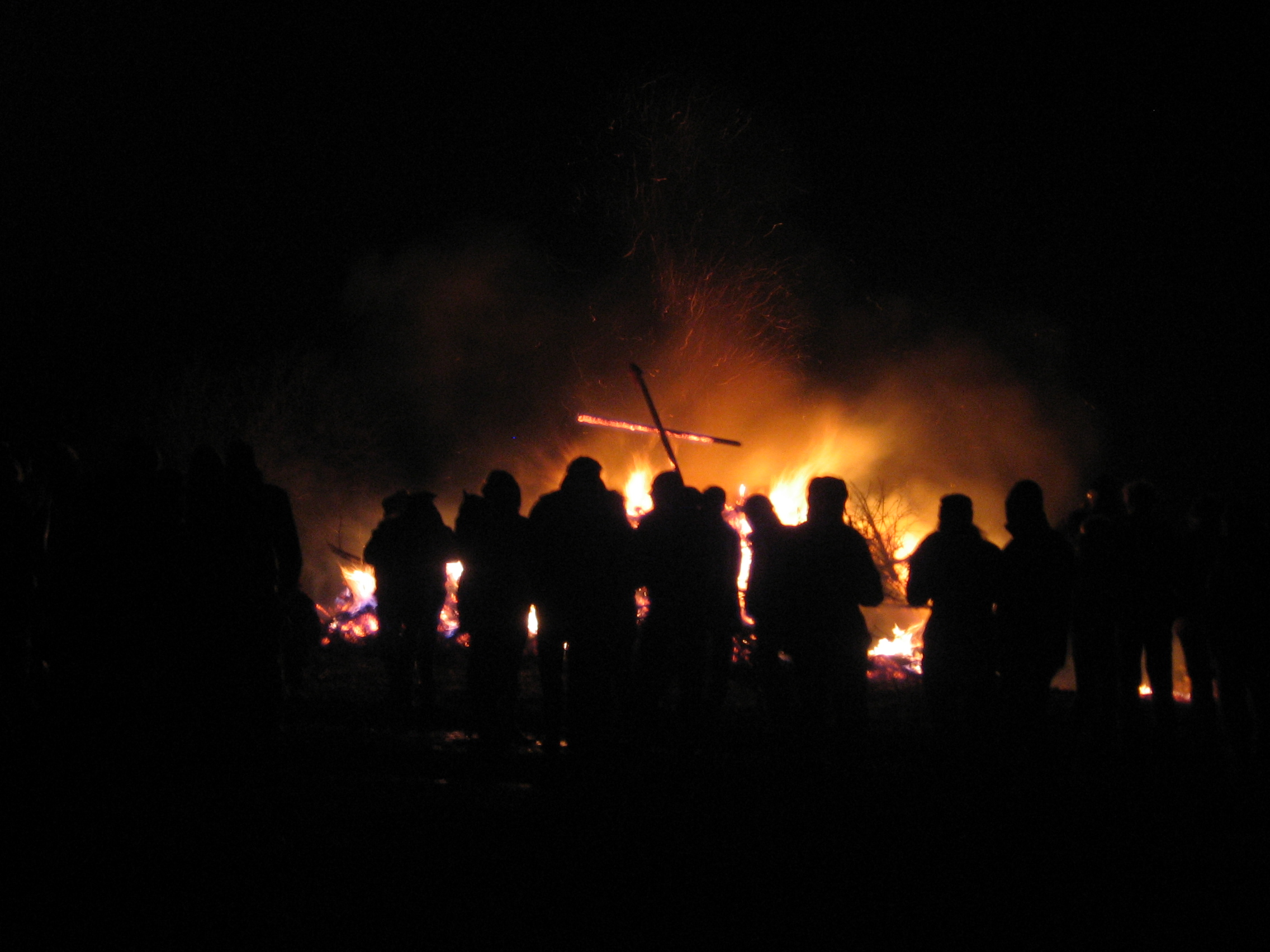
Biikebrennen in Risum-Lindholm (2008)

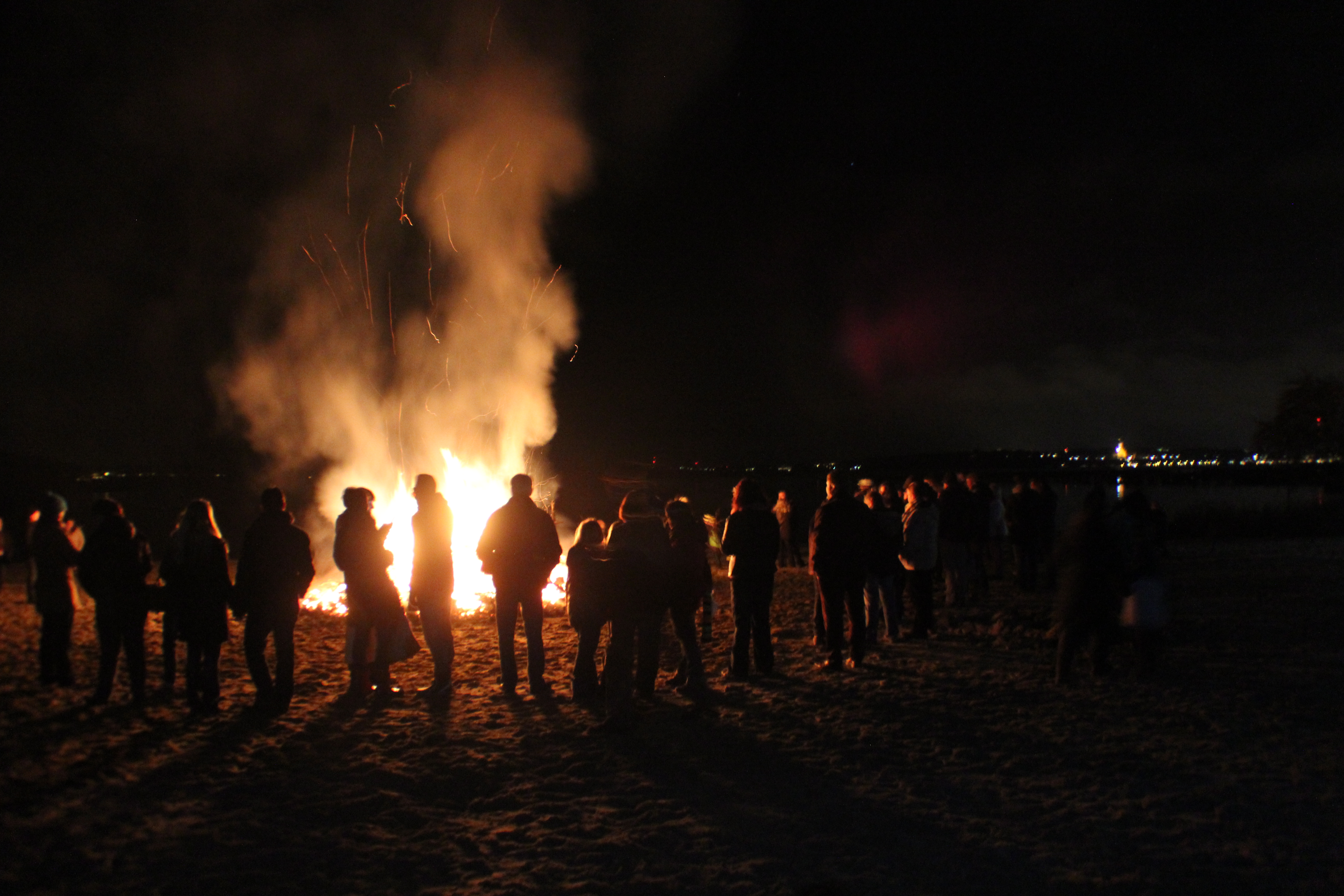
Biikebrennen in Flensburg (2014)

The Biikebrennen (meaning "bonfires" in Northern Low Saxon), Biikebrånen (in North Frisian) or Pers Awten (meaning "Saint Peter's Eve" in South Jutish) is an annual bonfire night celebration held on 21 February in North Frisia, in the German state of Schleswig-Holstein and in Southern Jutland in Denmark.

The origin of Biikebrennen is unclear but the roots of the festival stem from pagan times. The meaning has changed over time. During the 17th and 18th centuries, the event was especially associated with seafarers engaged in whaling. The ritual varies a little from location to location. At Biikebrennen, nearly all North Frisian towns, and many isolated farmhouses as well, light their own bonfires, known locally as biike, at or shortly after sunset to bid winter farewell.

== See also ==
- Up Helly Aa (fire festivals held annually in the Shetland Islands)
- Burgbrennen (very similar custom in Luxembourg)
- Funkenfeuer (similar custom in Swabian-Alemannic area)
- Feuerrad (similar custom in Westphalia, Hesse, Bavaria, Switzerland)
- Hüttenbrennen (similar custom in the Eifel)
- Osterfeuer (similar German custom at Easter)
- Sechseläuten (similar Swiss custom in Zürich)
