= Buergbrennen =

Celebration in Luxembourg and surrounding areas

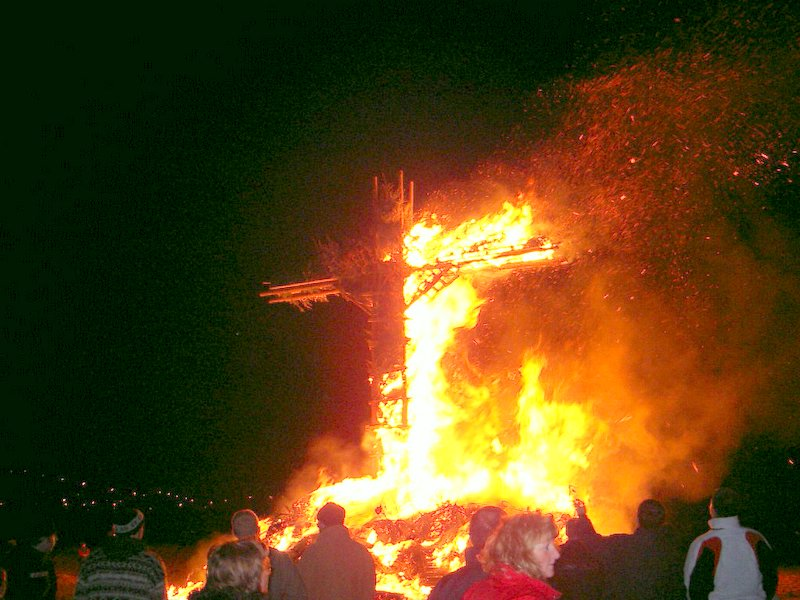
Buergbrennen in Junglinster, Luxembourg

Buergbrennen is a celebration centred on a huge bonfire which takes place on the first Sunday in Lent in Luxembourg and surrounding areas. In Germany it is called Burgbrennen, in France and Belgium it is known as the dimanche des Brandons. It is based on old traditions representing the end of winter and the coming of spring.

== Etymology ==
The word brennen or "burn" originates from the Latin burere "to burn." In the south of Belgium, the day is still known as dimanche des Bures.

== History ==
The burning of fires apparently originated with pagan feasts in connection with the spring equinox on 21 March. The current tradition of holding it on the first Sunday of Lent is therefore probably an approximation based on the Christian calendar. While the tradition is waning in Belgium, France and Germany, since the 1930s Luxembourg has revived the Buergbrennen festivities with some 75% of villages celebrating the occasion. Originally the bonfire seems simply to have consisted of a heap of wood and straw but as time went by, a central pillar of tree branches was introduced. A crosspiece was later attached near the top of the pillar, giving it the appearance of a cross.

The buergbrennen was once celebrated only by the men in the village, women being admitted only under exceptional circumstances. The most recently married men played a special role, the honor of lighting the fire falling on the last man to have wed. But the newly-weds also had the responsibility of collecting wood for the fire or paying others to assist in the work. At the end of the festivities, they were expected to entertain those taking part, either at home or in local inns. The tradition began to die out in the 19th century because of the high costs involved, but in the 20th century local authorities revived the tradition, taking over responsibility for the arrangements and the costs involved.

== Buergbrennen today ==
The local authorities or youth organisations usually make the arrangements for the Buergbrennen. They collect wood, often old Christmas trees, from the inhabitants and make the buerg or bonfire, usually on the top of a neighbouring hill and clad with hay to ensure rapid burning. There is often a cross rising high above the centre of the fire. Torchlight processions to the bonfire sometimes take place and there are usually stands for food and drink. The firemen are present to ensure against accidents. In some areas, the most recently married couple have the honor of lighting the fire.

== See also ==
- Funkenfeuer (similar custom in Swabian-Alemannic area)
- Feuerrad (similar custom in Westphalia, Hesse, Bavaria, Switzerland)
- Hüttenbrennen (similar custom in the Eifel)
- Osterfeuer (similar German custom at Easter)
- Sechseläuten (similar Swiss custom in Zürich)
- Biikebrennen (similar custom in North Frisia)
- Cross burning
