= Sechseläuten =

Zurich spring holiday

Coordinates: 47.3661°N 8.5459°E

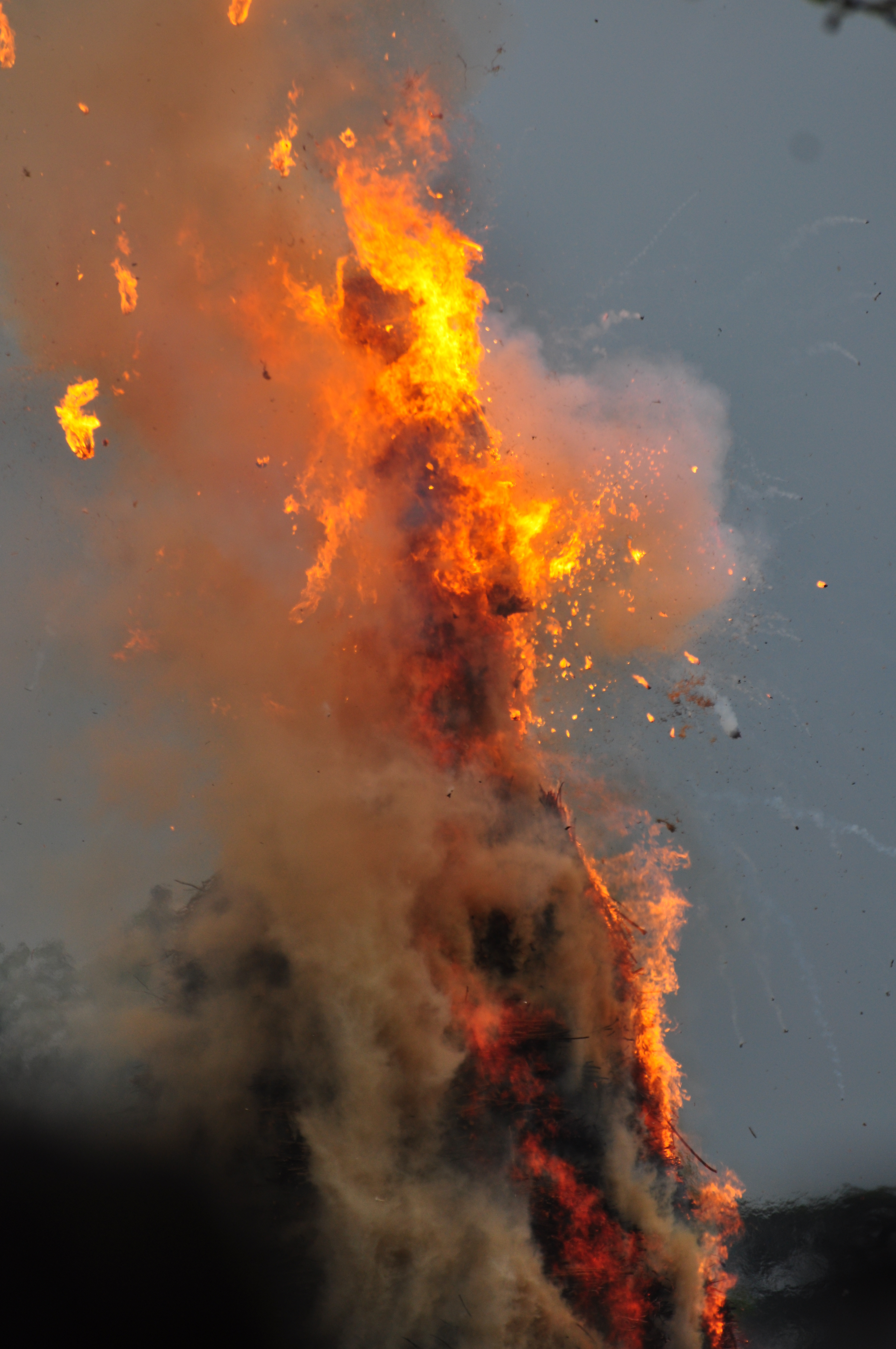
- Böögg in 2012
- Observed by: City of Zurich, Switzerland
- Date: third Monday in April (with exceptions)
- 2025 date: 28 April
- Frequency: annual

The Sechseläuten (Zurich German: Sächsilüüte, "The six o'clock ringing of the bells") is a traditional spring holiday in the Swiss city of Zurich celebrated in its current form, usually on the 3rd Monday of April, since the early 20th century.

== Burning of the Böögg ==
Following the parade of the Zünfte (guilds), the climax of the holiday is the burning of Winter in effigy, in the form of the Böögg, a figure of a snowman prepared with explosives. The custom of burning a rag doll called Böögg predates the Sechseläuten. A Böögg (cognate to bogey) was originally a masked character doing mischief and frightening children during the carnival season. The neighborhood association Zum Kratz has burned a Böögg each year, but originally the effigy represented some yearly disaster such as the influenza. The burning was also partially a protest against the demolition of the neighborhood Zum Kratz, which was accomplished around 1890. In 1892 the guilds then received the responsibility of burning the effigy, but now it no longer represented some disaster, but rather the winter itself, which is why the doll nowadays resembles a snowman. The combination of the Sechseläuten parade and the burning of an official Böögg was introduced in 1902. In that same year, the location of burning the Böögg was moved from the left to the right shore of Lake Zurich. The square where the Böögg was burnt was called Tonhalleplatz until 1947, when it was renamed into Sechseläuten Square.

== Weather oracle ==
Popular tradition has it that the time between the lighting of the pyre and the explosion of the Böögg's head is indicative of the coming summer: a quick explosion promises a warm, sunny summer, a drawn-out burning indicates a cold and rainy one. The shortest time on record is 5:07 minutes in 1974 and the longest is 57:00 minutes in 2023.

== History ==
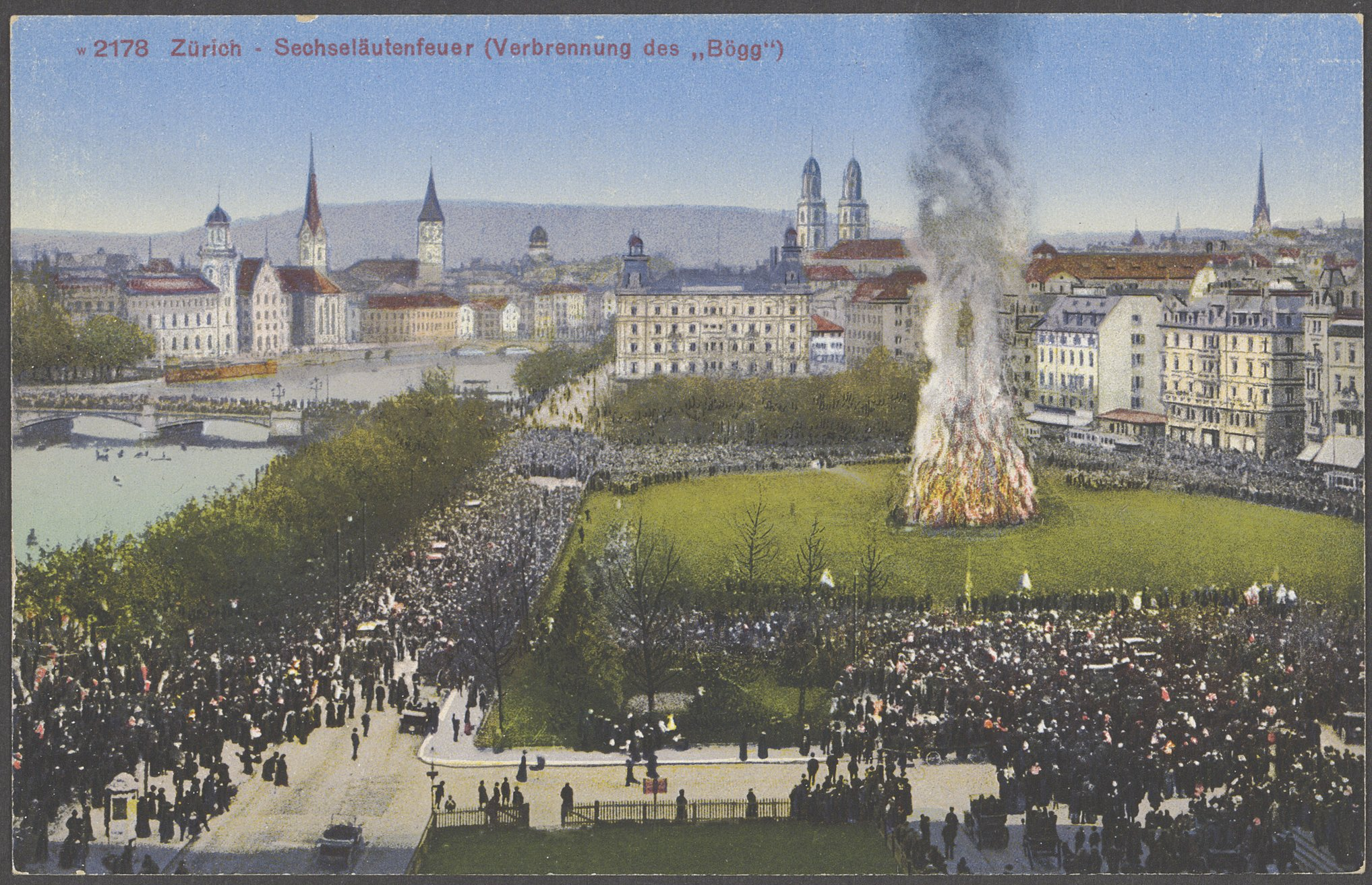
Burning the Böögg around 1902

The roots of the festival go back to medieval times when the first day of summer working hours was celebrated in the guildhalls across the city. City ordinances strictly regulated the length of the working day in that era. During the winter semester the workday in all workshops lasted as long as there was daylight, but during the summer semester (i.e. starting on Monday following vernal equinox) the law proclaimed that work must cease when the church bells tolled at six o'clock. Sechseläuten is a Swiss German word that literally translates into "The six o'clock ringing of the bells". Changing to summer working hours traditionally was a joyous occasion because it marked the beginning of the season where people had some non-working daylight hours. But initially the guilds were only responsible for organizing a parade, and not for burning the Böögg.

Burnings of Böögg figures (the Swiss German term for "bogey", in origin scary-looking ragdolls) in spring are attested in various places of the city from the late 18th and early 19th century, without direct connection to the Sechseläuten.

From 1902 until 1951, the holiday used to be held on the first Monday following vernal equinox. On that day, the Fraumünster bell, for the first time in the year, tolled to mark the end of working hours at 6 p.m. (historically the time of sunset on vernal equinox). The holiday was moved to the third Monday of April in 1952. Because of the later date, and because of summer time introduced in 1981, the lighting of the Böögg's pyre at 6 p.m. has now moved to several hours before nightfall. Additionally, because of its present date, the holiday is often within a week of 1 May, leading to a stark contrast between the upper class dominated Sechseläuten and the working class holiday of May Day. This proximity of the major festivals of two political poles of the society of Zurich has led to various interferences in the past, for example the abduction of the Böögg in 2006 by leftist "revolutionaries" a few days before the Sechseläuten. Since then, several Bööggs are held in reserve with the main one stored at a bank nearby the Sechseläutenplatz (the open area in front of the Opernhaus near Bellevue where most Zurich open air activities take place). Since 2010 the guilds of Zurich allow the women of Gesellschaft zu Fraumünster to practice Sechseläuten, usually just being guests of the guilds respectively the Constaffel society, but still not being as an official guild in Zurich.

In 2020 and 2021 the Sechseläuten parade was cancelled owing to COVID-19 pandemic; 2020 was the first time in almost 100 years that it had not taken place. It returned as normal on 25 April 2022.

In 2023, the whole executive council of Schwyz took part in the festivities. The Federal Councilors Viola Amherd, Elisabeth Baume-Schneider and the Presidents of the National Council and the Council of States Martin Candinas and Brigitte Häberli-Koller were also present.

== Burning the Böögg during the years ==
In 1921, the Böögg was burned early by a student instigated by communists. A replacement was found quickly though and the effigy could be burned again and as mandated.

In 1923, it rained too much, and the Böögg did not burn.

In 1941 during World War II, no Böögg was burned as the field was used to plant corn.

In 1942 it was again possible to burn the Böögg, but the field was not allowed to be stepped on as the field was used to plant potatoes.

In 1943 the field was used to plant wheat, therefore the location of burning the Böögg was moved onto the dam in the Enge harbor.

In 1944 the Böögg was again burned at the Enge harbor, but this time the Böögg fell into Lake Zurich as the construction was not stable enough. Some people then pulled the effigy out of the lake and at least threw its head into the fire.

In 2007, the explosion of the Böögg's head took place 12 minutes and 9 seconds after the pyre was lit, promising a medium warm summer.

In 2008, heavy rains soaked the Böögg and the wood pyre materials so much that firemen had to spray the pyre with kerosene or fuel oil after initial ignition in addition to 15 liters of fire accelerant which was initially thrown on the pyre. It took 26 minutes and 1 second for the Böögg's head head to explode which indicates a poor weather summer. The fact that the head, instead of traditionally exploding, burnt down very quietly caused a lot of confusion. After approximately 20 minutes the head had burnt away completely, but leaving a large piece of the neck hanging from the stake. It was the explosion of that piece that ended this year's event.

In 2012, it took 12 minutes and 7 seconds, and in this year there was some confusion if both firecrackers in the neck of the Böögg had exploded. It was determined that 12 minutes, 7 secs was the mark.

In 2014, the head exploded quite quickly (7 minutes and 23 seconds) but it ended up being a poor summer.

In 2015, the head exploded quite quickly and it ended up being a very good summer.

In 2016, the head exploded after 43 minutes and 34 seconds, setting a new record, which held until 2023.

In 2017, the head exploded after 9 minutes and 56 seconds. A quick time and a summer followed.

In 2020, Sechseläuten was cancelled due to the COVID-19 pandemic.

In 2021, the head exploded after 12 minutes and 57 seconds. Sechseläuten was again cancelled but the Böögg was still burned. To avoid crowds that could spread COVID-19 the Böögg was relocated to Schöllenen Gorge in the canton of Uri and burned outside Zurich for the first time in its history.

In 2023 the head exploded in 57 minutes exactly, setting a new record. This year the Böögg also bore a halberd in memory of Canton Schwyz which was the guest.

In 2024 the burning of the Böögg was canceled due to high winds, although the parade and celebration took place.

In 2025 the head exploded in 26 minutes and 30 seconds.

In 2026, the head exploded in 12 minutes and 48 seconds.

== Additional events ==
Additional events of the holiday nowadays also include:

1. A 'Kinderumzug' (children's parade) in historic and folkloristic costumes on the Sunday preceding the Sechseläuten.
2. A very colorful afternoon parade of the 26 guilds in their historic dress costumes, each with its own band, most with a sizable mounted 'Reitergruppe', and horse drawn floats, to the 'Sechseläutenplatz' at the lakeshore where the Böögg is burnt.
3. A ceremonial galloping of the mounted units of the guilds around the bonfire.
4. Lunch and dinner banquets for the guildmembers and their guests.
5. The 'Auszug', the nighttime visits of delegations of each of the 26 guilds to several other guilds in their guildhalls to exchange greetings, toasts, witticisms and gifts.

== Sechseläutenmarsch ==
During this festival the popular march known as the Sechseläutenmarsch is played. It has no known composer but likely originated in Russia.

== Gallery ==
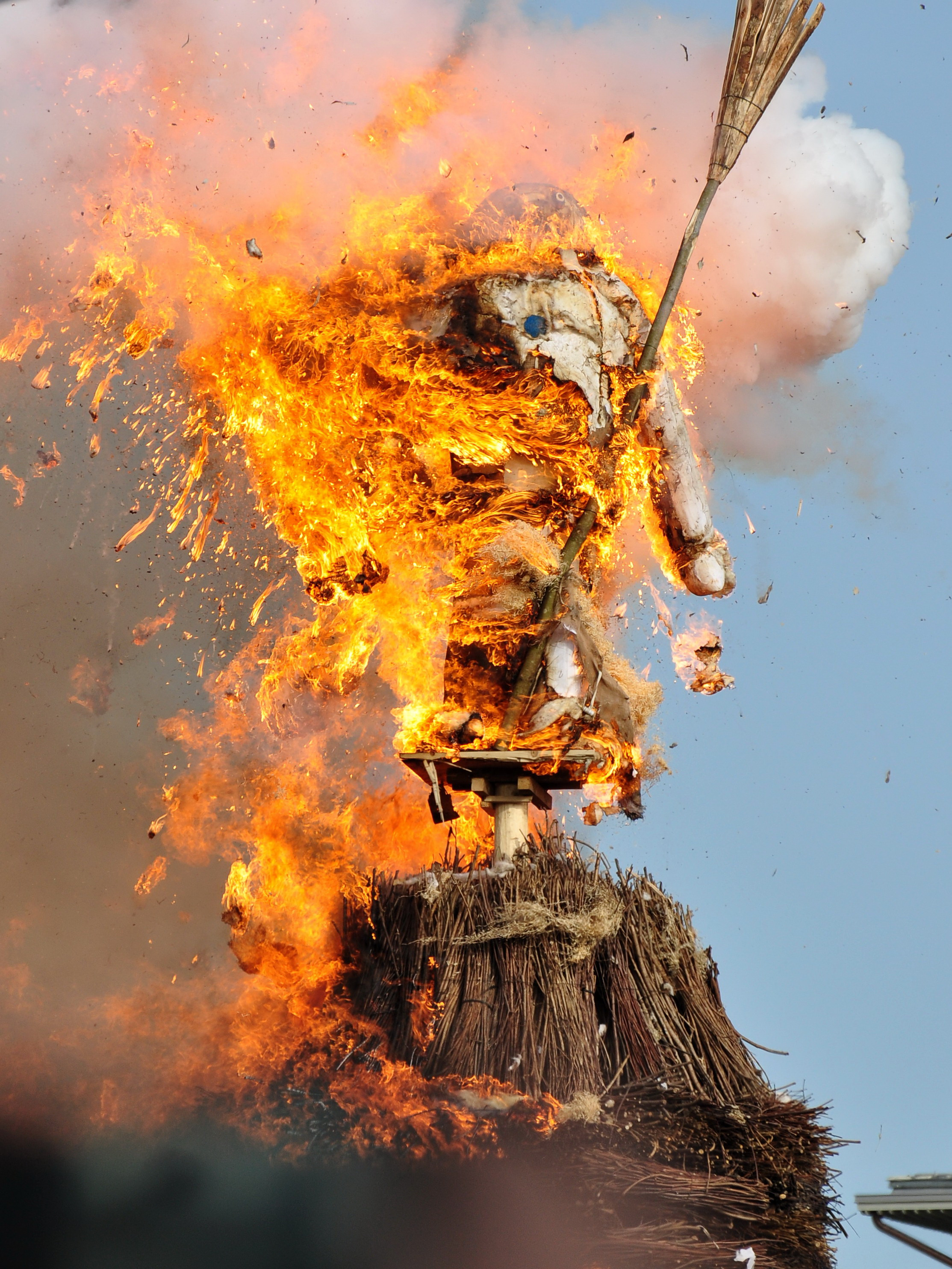
The Böögg 2011

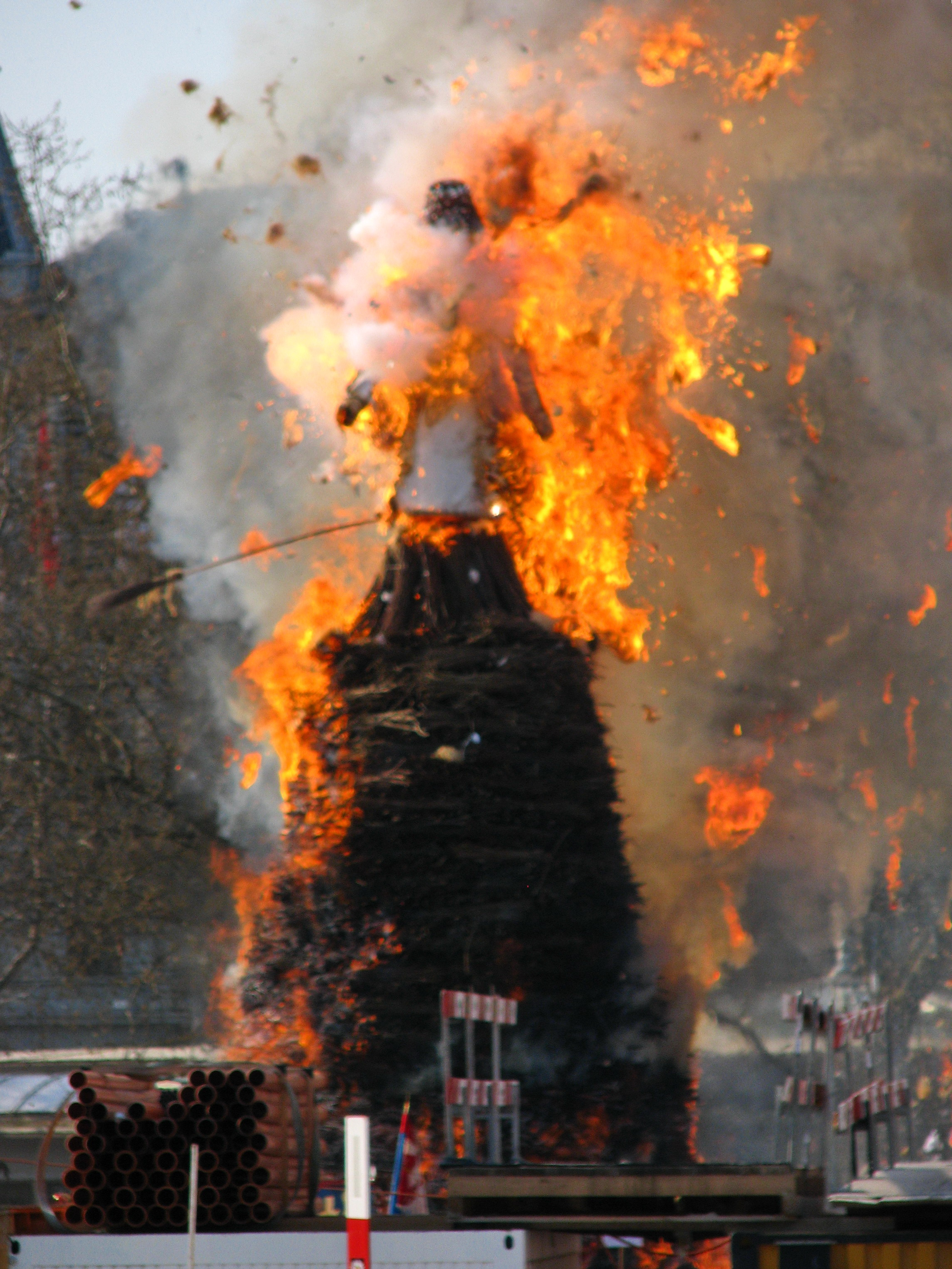
The Böögg 2010

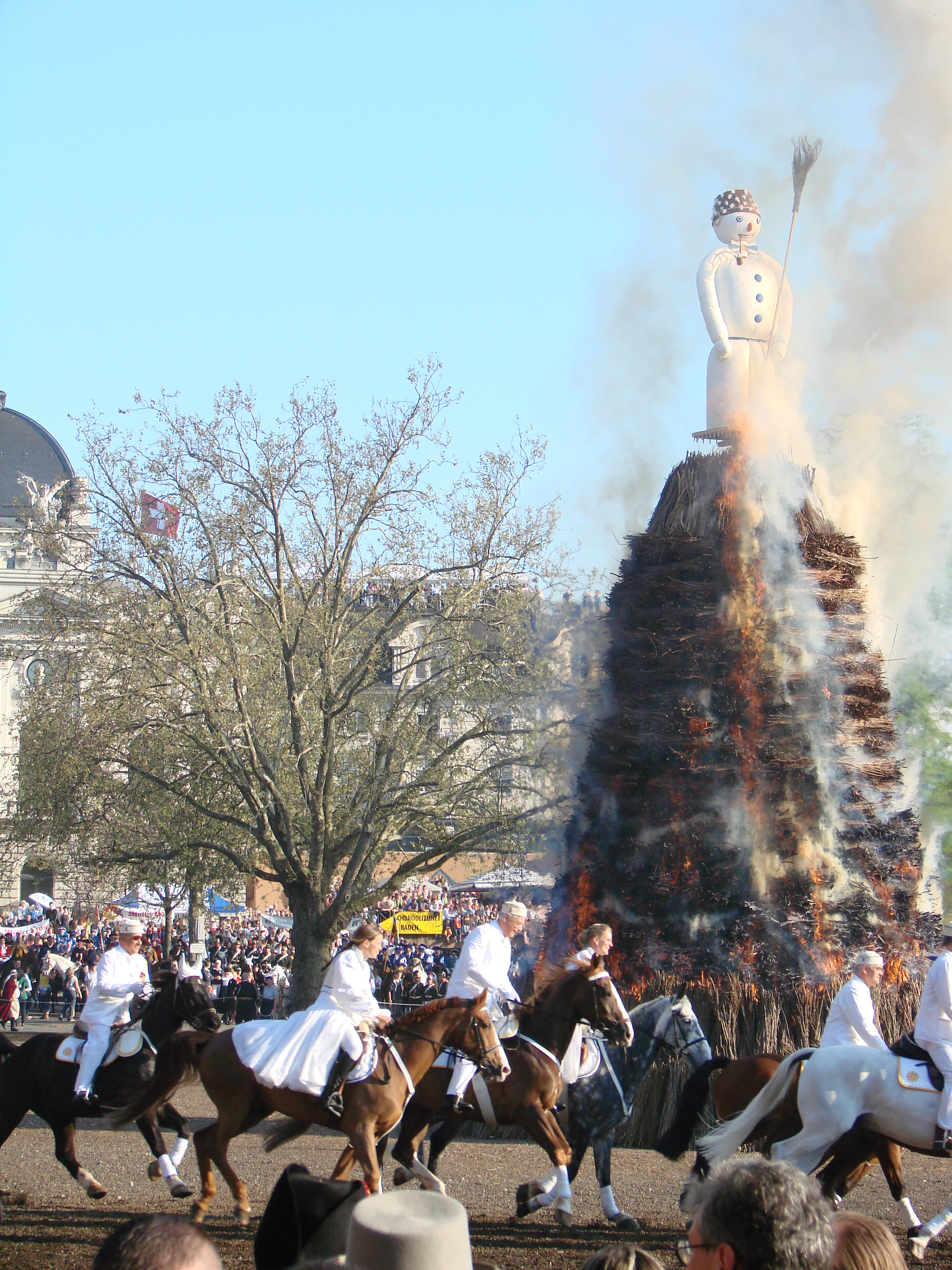
Sechseläuten 2007

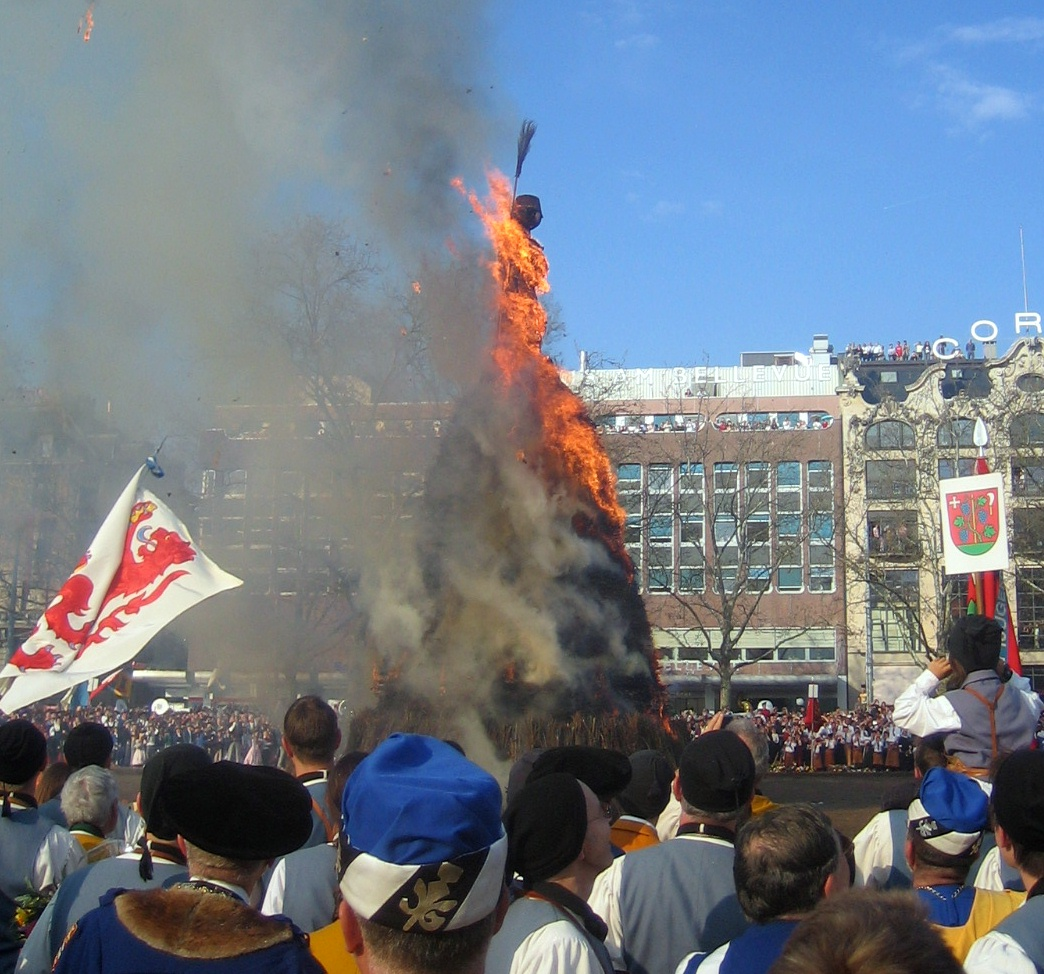
The Böögg 2006

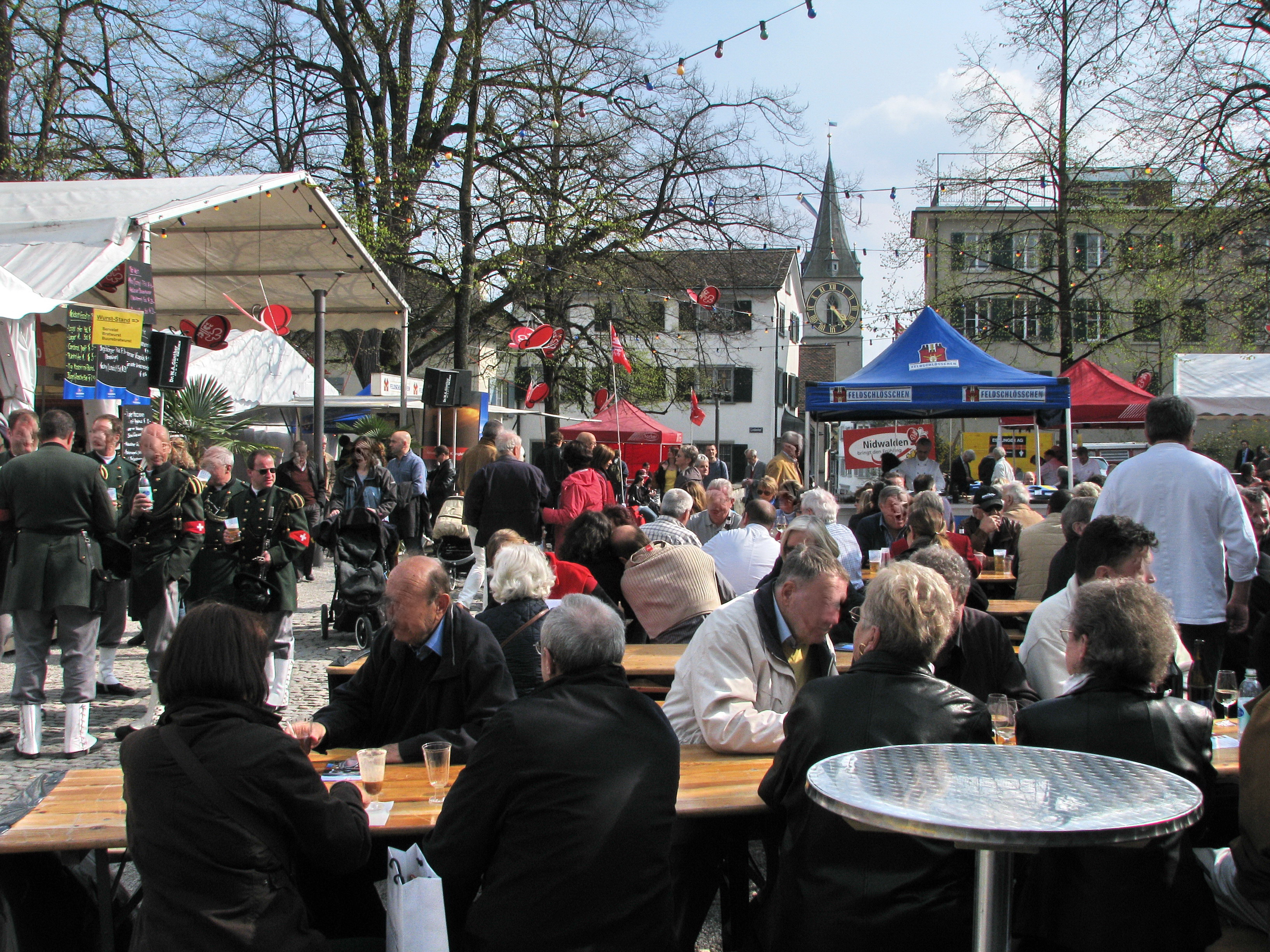
Funfair at Lindenhof hill (April 2010)

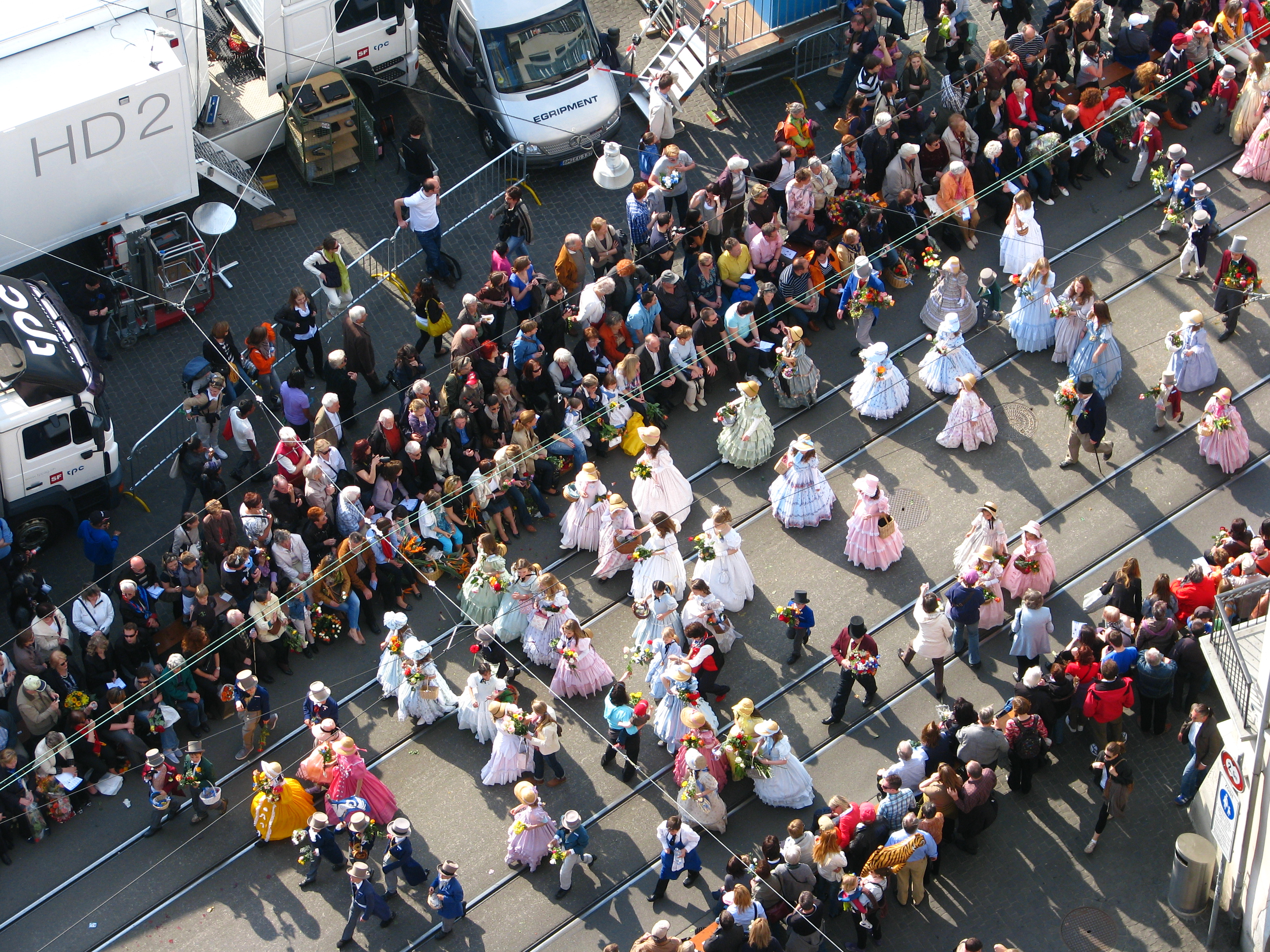
Parade at Limmatquai (2010)

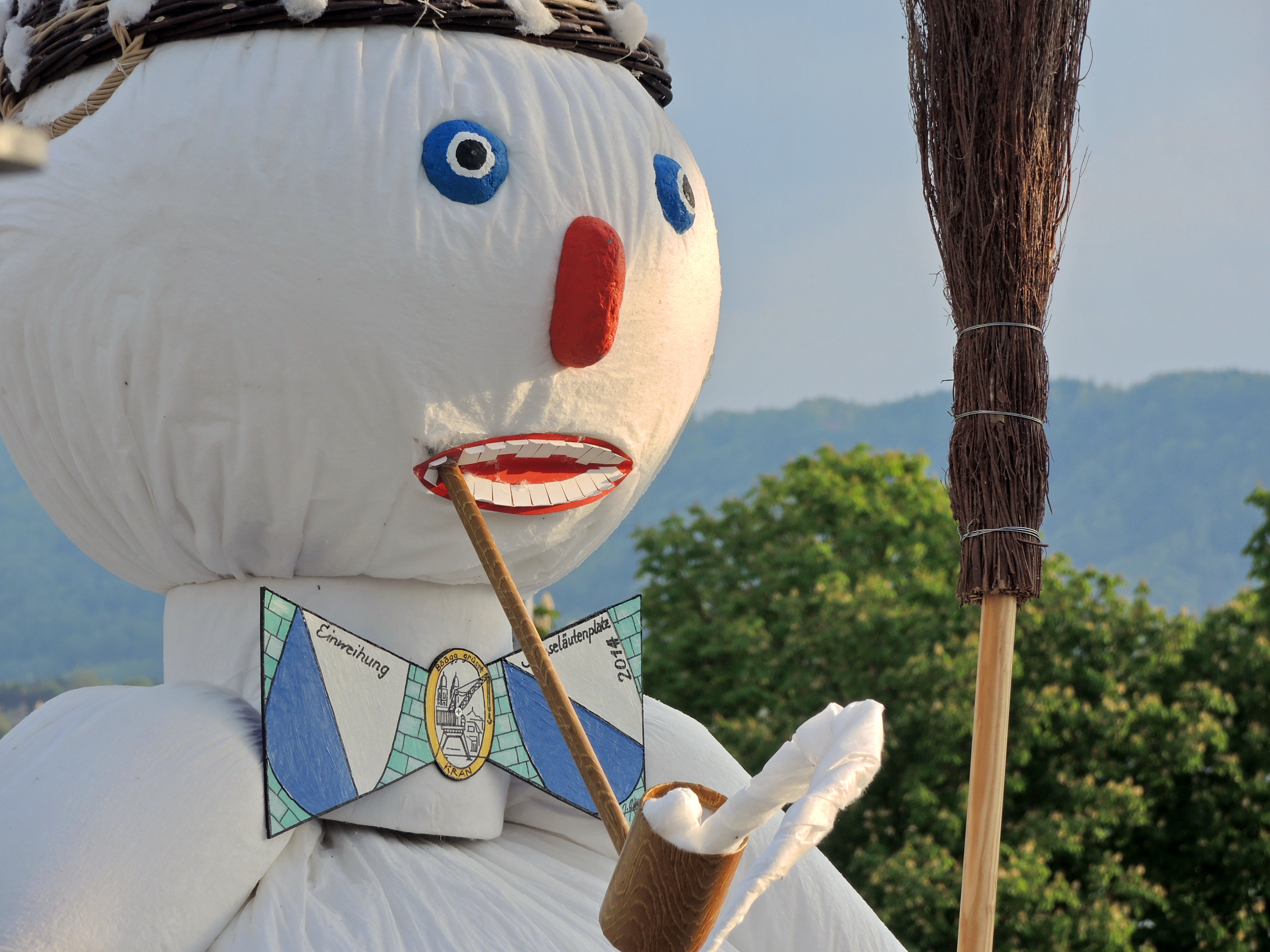
The Böögg's smiling face ...

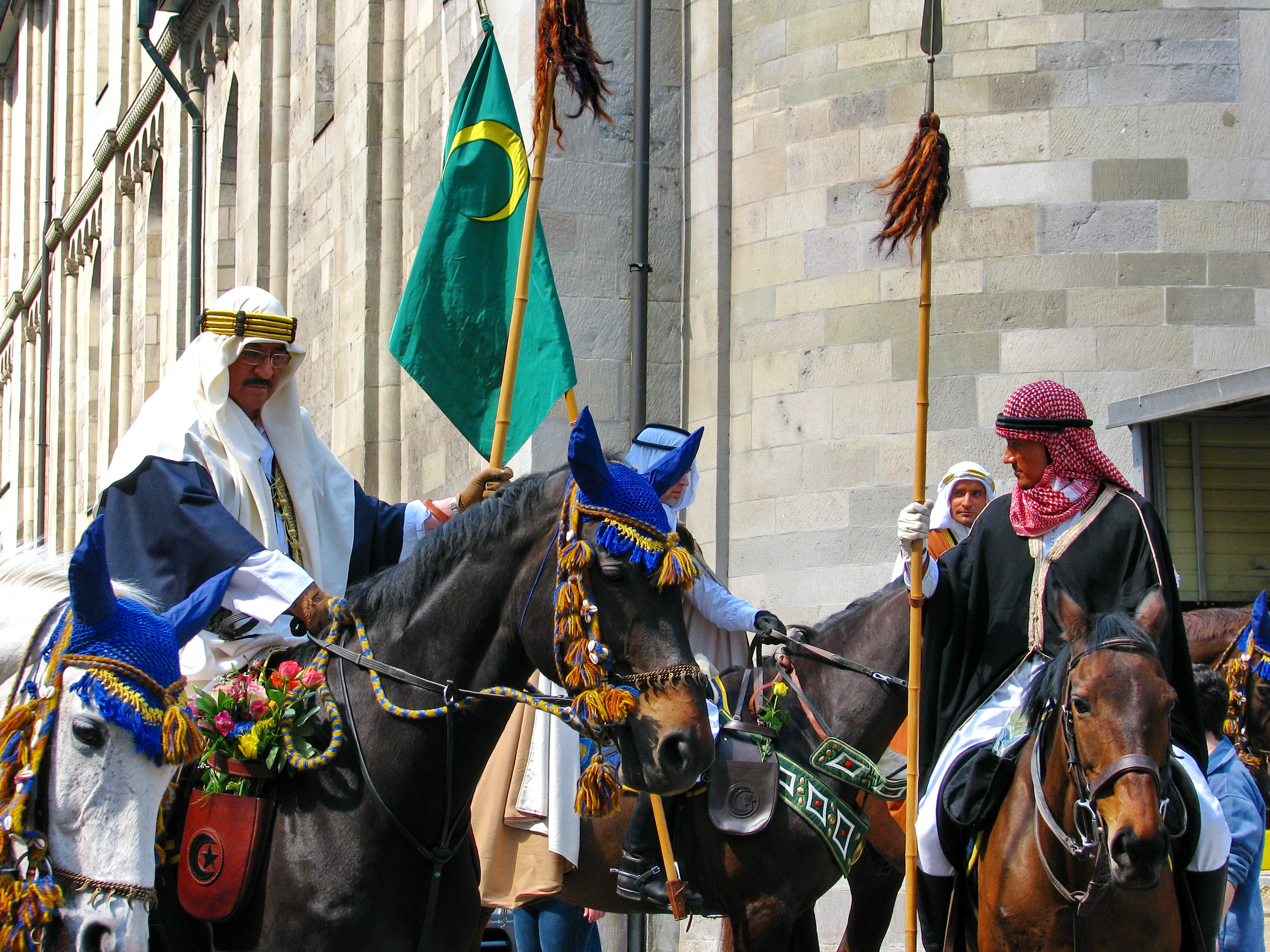
Members of the Kämbel guild preparing for the parade (2010)

== Date ==
With a few exceptions, the date is fixed to the third Monday in April.

The forthcoming dates are:

- 19 April 2027
- 24 April 2028
- 16 April 2029
- 8 April 2030
- 21 April 2031
- 19 April 2032
- 25 April 2033
- 17 April 2034
- 16 April 2035

== Similar traditions ==
- Maslenitsa
- Māra
- Morana

== See also ==
- Zünfte of Zurich
- History of Zurich
- Burgbrennen (very similar custom in Luxembourg)
- Funkenfeuer (similar custom in Swabian-Alemannic area)
- Feuerrad (similar custom in Westphalia, Hesse, Bavaria, Switzerland)
- Hüttenbrennen (similar custom in the Eifel)
- Osterfeuer (similar German custom at Easter)
- Biikebrennen (similar custom in North Frisia)
- Burning Man (in Black Rock City, Nevada, United States)
