= Prümerburg =

- Prümzurlay
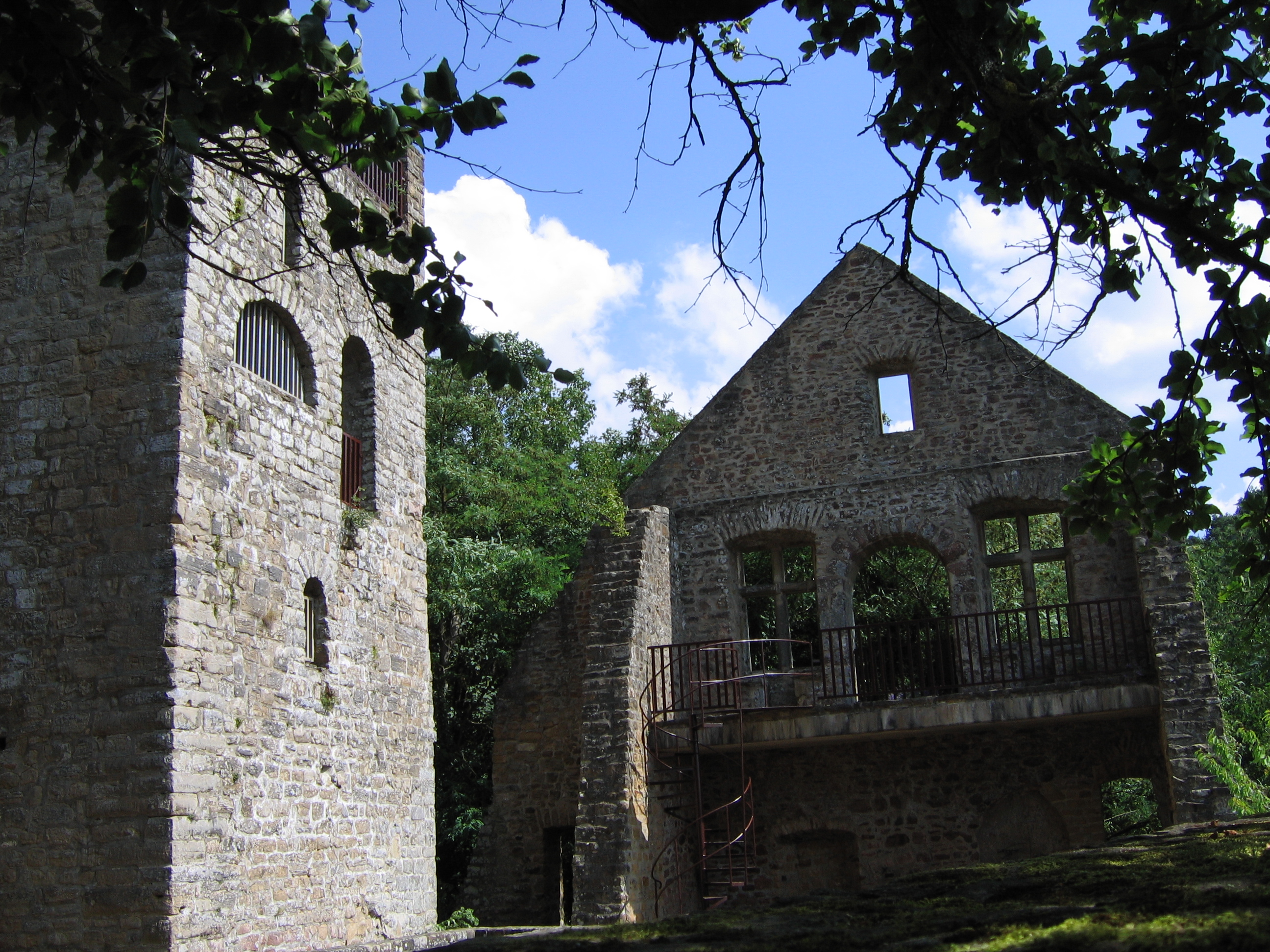
- Prümerburg from the front. Left: the bergfried; right: the remains of the palas

Site information
- Type: hill castle
- Code: DE-RP
- Condition: ruin

Location
- Coordinates: 49°52′6.5″N 6°26′36″E

Site history
- Built: c. 1100 to 1200

Garrison information
- Occupants: nobility

The Prümerburg is a ruined hill castle on a roughly 30-metre-high Lias-sandstone rock on the upper edge of the valley of the Prüm in the municipality of Prümzurlay in the county of Bitburg-Prüm in the German state of Rhineland-Palatinate.

== History ==
The Prümerburg, a fief of the counts and dukes of Luxembourg, is first recorded in 1337, but was probably built in the 12th century. In the immediate vicinity there was an earlier prehistorical hillfort (Wallburgen). The castle's features include the remains of a pentagonal bergfried. The Prümerburg is believed to have burned down in 1658.

In 1337, Walter of Meysenburg is the first recorded vassal. In 1351, Godfrey of Meysenburg and his wife, Catharina of Homburg, were the enfeofees, later Prümzurlay, like Clerf, went to the lords of Brandenburg (a side line of the counts of Vianden). Subsequently there is evidence that the von Vinstingen and von Haracourt families (both by marriage) were vassals. A line of the von der Heyden family bought the Lordship of Prümerburg in the Early Modern Period, along with Niederweis and Stolzemburg.

To the northwest in the valley, the castle chapel, the Late Gothic former Chapel of St. Nicholas, has survived.

== Literature ==
- Bernd Altmann, Hans Caspary: Kulturdenkmäler in Rheinland-Pfalz. Denkmaltopographie Bundesrepublik Deutschland, Band 9.2: Kreis Bitburg-Prüm. Stadt Bitburg, Verbandsgemeinden Bitburg-Land und Irrel. Werner, Worms, 1997, p. 500–501.
- Johann Friedrich Schannat, Georg Baersch: Eiflia illustrata oder geographische und historische Beschreibung der Eifel. Die Städte und Ortschaften der Eifel und deren Umgegend. Topographisch und historisch beschrieben, Vol. 3, Aachen, 1852.
