= Prümzurlay =

- Municipality
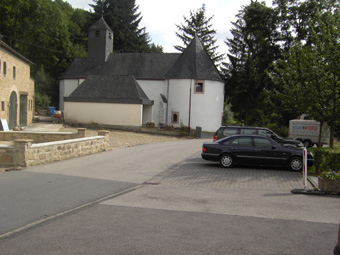

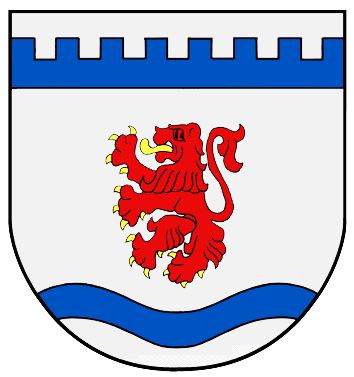
- Coat of arms

- Location of Prümzurlay within Eifelkreis Bitburg-Prüm district
- Interactive map of Prümzurlay
- Location within Germany Location within Rhineland-Palatinate
- Coordinates: 49°52′08″N 6°26′18″E
- Country: Germany
- State: Rhineland-Palatinate
- District: Eifelkreis Bitburg-Prüm
- Municipal assoc.: Südeifel

Government
  - Mayor (2019–24): Alfred Blasen

Area
  - Total: 3.83 km^{2} (1.48 sq mi)
- Elevation: 180–340 m (590–1,120 ft)

Population (2025-12-31)
  - Total: 520
  - Density: 140/km^{2} (350/sq mi)
- Time zone: UTC+01:00 (CET)
  - Summer (DST): UTC+02:00 (CEST)
- Postal codes: 54668
- Dialling codes: 06523
- Vehicle registration: BIT
- Website: Prümzurlay at site www.suedeifelinfo.de

Prümzurlay is a municipality in the district of Bitburg-Prüm, in Rhineland-Palatinate, western Germany.

In 1960, the first bungalow holiday village in Germany was built near the ruins of the Prümerburg and is now named after the castle.

== Sights ==
- Devil's Gorge
