= Lindenhof (disambiguation) =

Lindenhof may refer to:

- Switzerland
  - Lindenhof (Rapperswil), a hill and historical core of Rapperswil.
  - Lindenhof (Zürich), district of that name in its correct name.
  - Lindenhof, district or geographical location of that name.
  - Lindenhof (quarter), district of that name, redirect to Altstadt (Zürich)
  - Lindenhof hill, geographical formation, moraine, and public hilltop square in Zürich
  - Oppidum Zürich-Lindenhof
- Germany
  - Lindenhof locality in Hatzfeld
  - Theater Lindenhof, in nearby Burladingen

== See also ==
- Linderhof
