= Natural History Museum of the University of Zurich =

Museum in Zurich, Switzerland

Coordinates: 47.375278°N 8.548056°E

Natural History Museum, Zurich
- Naturhistorisches Museum der Universität Zürich
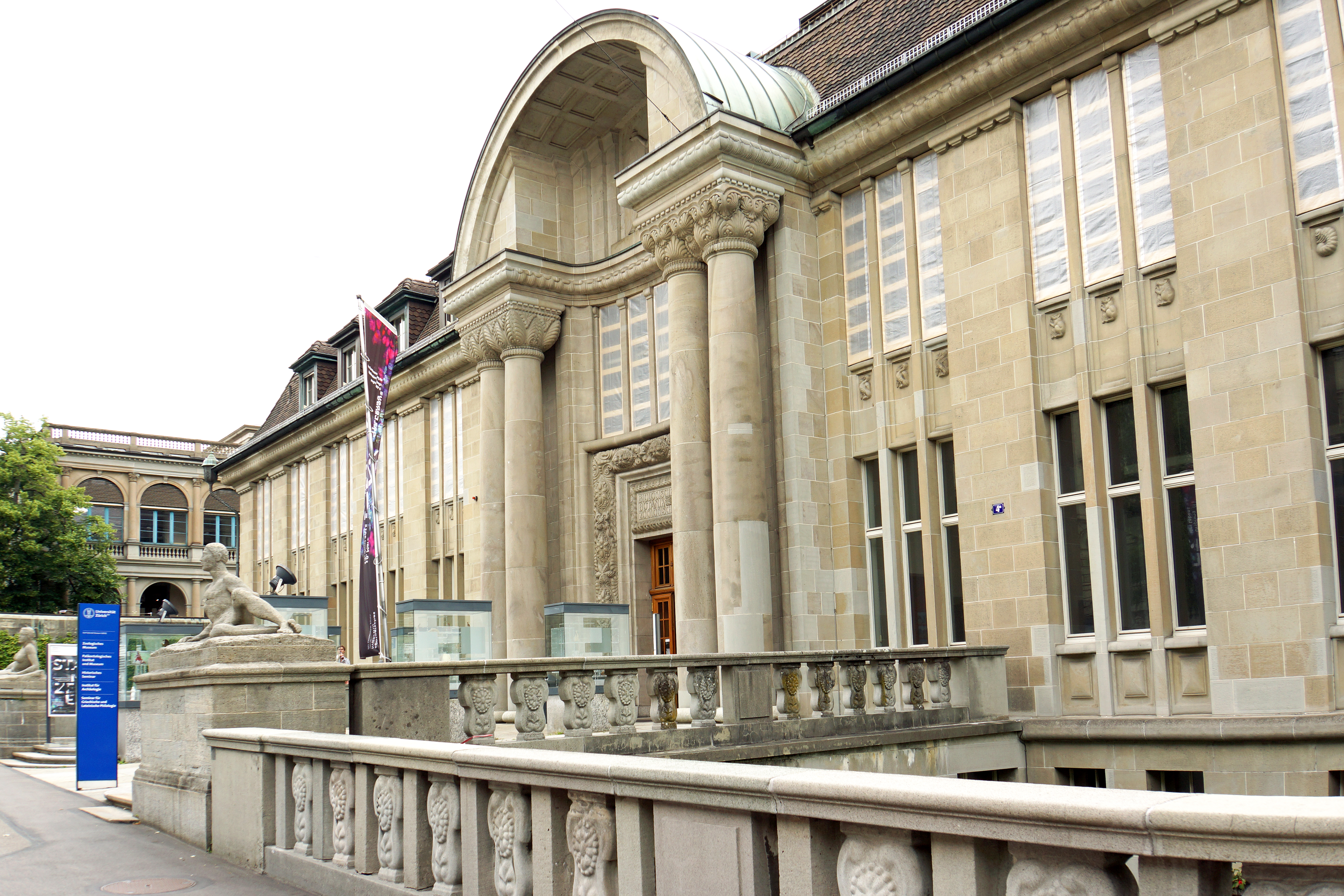
- Entrance of the museum
- Established: 2024
- Location: Karl Schmid-Strasse 4, Zurich, Switzerland
- Type: Natural history museum
- Director: Isabel Klusman
- Website: www.nmz.uzh.ch/en.html

The Natural History Museum of the University of Zurich (Naturhistorisches Museum der Universität Zürich) is a natural history museum in Zurich, Switzerland. It was established in 2024 through the merger of several museums of the University of Zurich, namely the former Zoological Museum, Paleontological Museum, Anthropological Museum and Botanical Museum. It is located in the main building of the University of Zurich in the city center.

== Exhibition ==
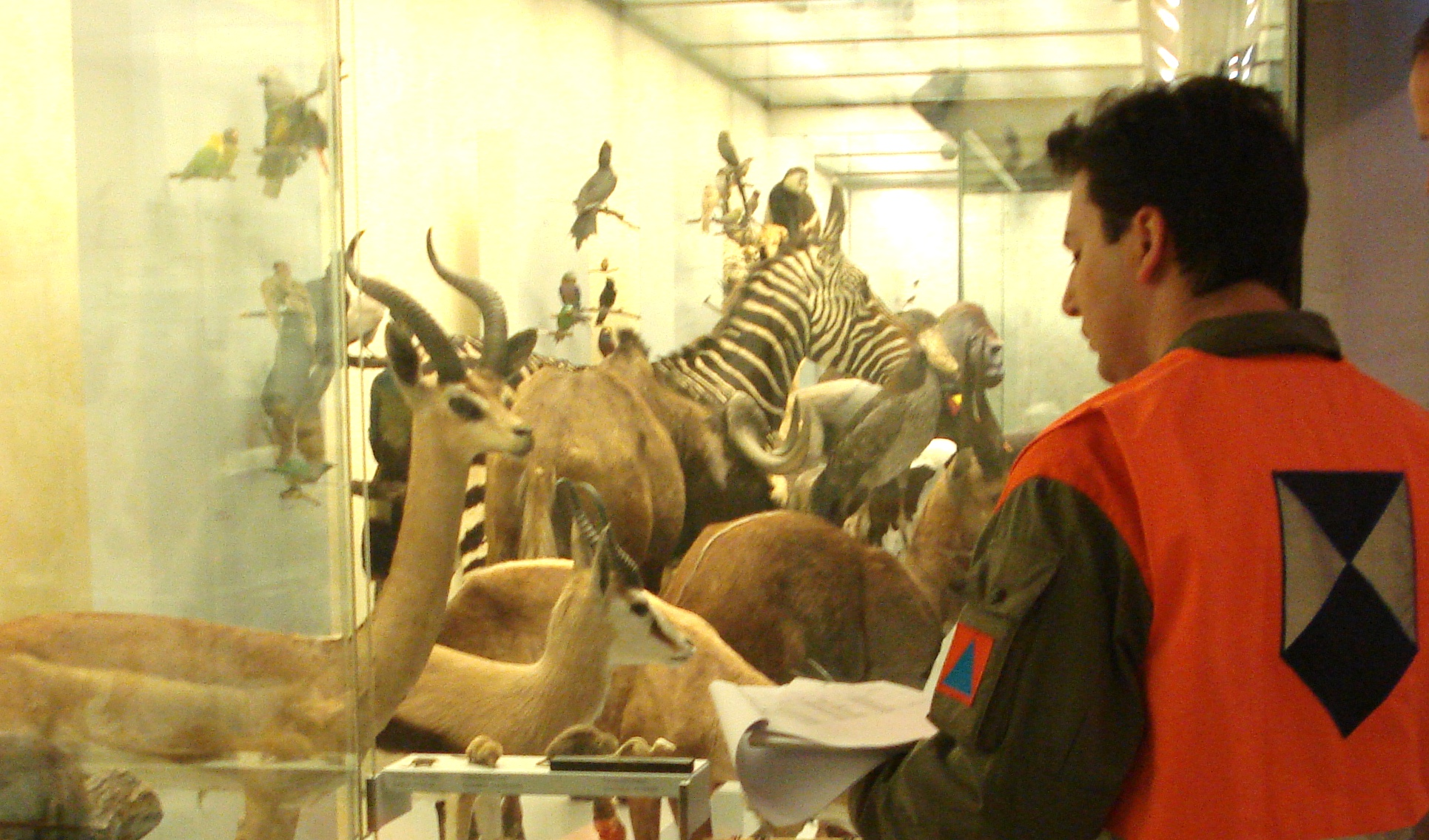
Exhibits of the zoological collection

The museum exhibits various animals of Switzerland and around the world, both extinct and living. Its zoological collections feature skeletons and padded specimens of mammals and birds along with reptiles, amphibians and invertebrates, which are grouped according to their zoogeographic regions. Its paleontological exhibition features fossils, mainly of Monte San Giorgio (canton of Ticino) which includes sauropterygians, ichthyosaurs, thalattosaurs and other marine reptiles, but also some dinosaurs. Its paleanthropological section has early humans and their close relatives (such as Homo erectus and Australopithecus afarensis) on display, Part of the exhibition broaches the issue of convergent evolution, such as bipedalism in several groups. The museum's botany section focusses on plant communication.

The museum is open Tuesday to Sunday. The entry is free. On Sundays, there are free guided tours about variable topics, some also in English.

=== Paleontological exhibits ===
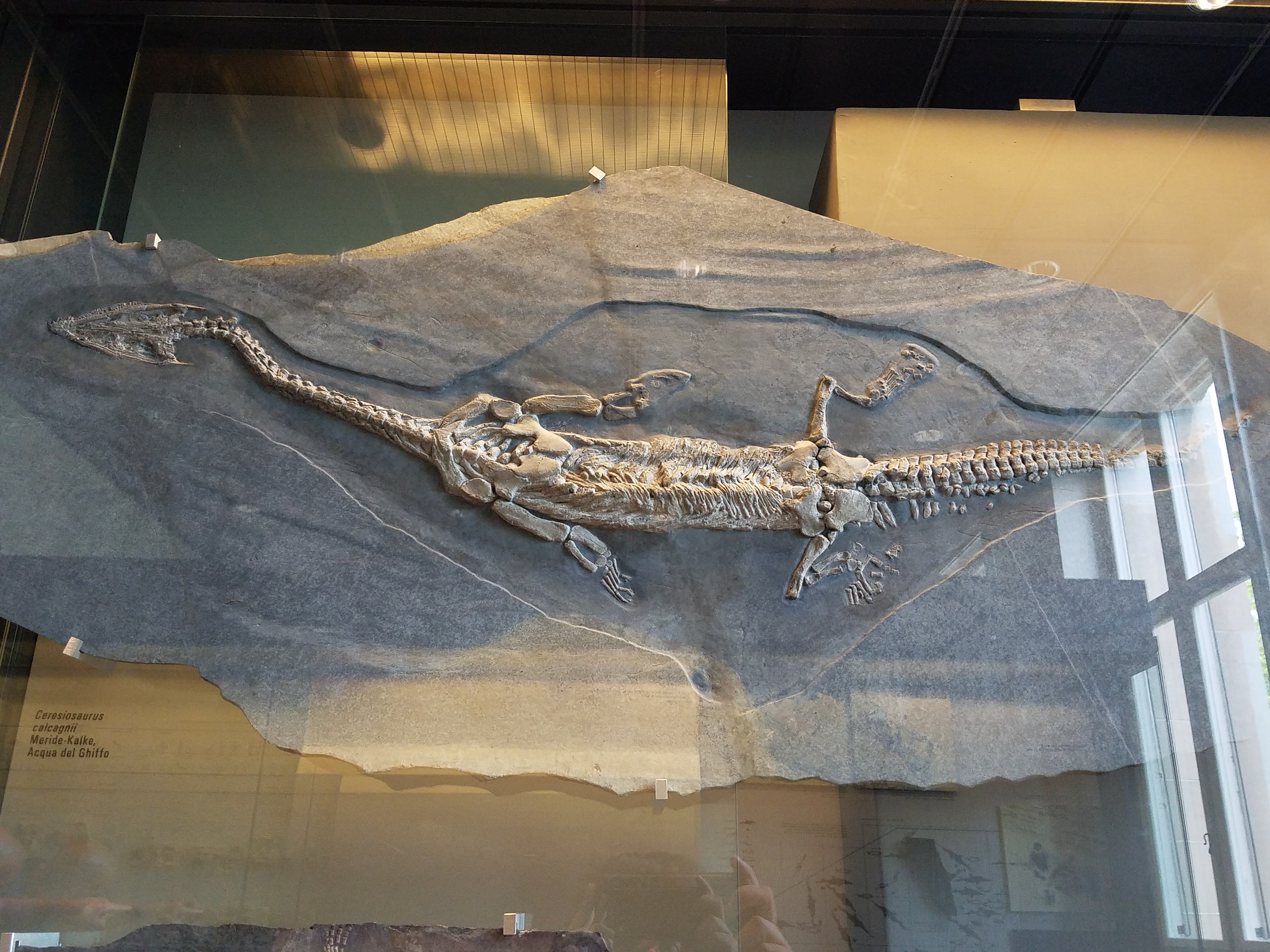
Fossil of the marine reptile Ceresiosaurus

The following is a partial list of vertebrate fossils (genera) exhibited at the museum:

- Acrodus
- Acronemus
- Allosaurus
- Argovisaurus
- Askeptosaurus
- Birgeria
- Ceresiosaurus
- Clarazia
- Cyamodus
- Cymbospondylus
- Diplodocus
- Helveticosaurus
- Hesperosaurus
- Macrocnemus
- Mixosaurus
- Neusticosaurus
- Nothosaurus
- Placodus
- Plateosaurus
- Saurichthys
- Tanystropheus
- Ticinosuchus

== History ==
The history of the Natural History Museum (NMZ) goes back to the 17th century, when zoological specimens were housed in private collections of local citizens of Zurich. Among these were, for example, the exhibits of Johann Jakob Scheuchzer and Johannes von Muralt. In 1833, after numerous expansions and relocations of the individual collections within Zurich, these collections were combined with others from the canton of Zurich and those of the Naturforschende Gesellschaft in Zürich for the purposes of university teaching and centralized. The exhibits became the property of the canton. In 1908, the university took over the collections of the city and canton, and in 1914 the former Zoological Museum (Zoologisches Museum der Universität Zürich) was established at the same location as the current NMZ.

In 1956, the Zoological Institute of the University of Zurich was reorganized into three independent institutes: the Zoological Museum, the Paleontological Museum, and the Zoological Institute. The Paleontological Museum was given space within the former Zoological Museum, which mainly exhibited fossils such as Middle Triassic marine reptiles and fishes from the UNESCO World Heritage Site Monte San Giorgio in the canton of Ticino, which wer collected under the guidances of Bernhard Peyer and later Emil Kuhn-Schnyder. In 1979, the non-public part of the collection, along with the Zoological Institute and the collection directorate, was relocated to the newly constructed campus of the University of Zurich-Irchel.

Between 1984 and 1991, the original building by Karl Moser was redesigned by the architect Ernst Gisel, incorporating the former atrium and expanding the museum's floor space. In 2024, the former Zoological Museum and Paleontological Museum, together with the Anthropological Museum (previously located on the Irchel campus) and the Botanical Museum (previously located at the Botanical Garden of the University of Zurich) were merged into a single museum, the NMZ.

== Transport ==
The museum can be reached by public transport from Central via the Polybahn to Polyterasse of the ETH. The top station of the Polybahn is within walking distance of the museum. The nearest tram stops are ETH/Universitätsspital, served by Zurich tram lines 6, 9 and 10, and Platte, served by tram lines 6 and 8. These tram stops are within walking distance to the museum.

== See also ==
- Aathal Dinosaur Museum
- List of museums in Switzerland
- List of natural history museums
- Mammoth Museum Niederweningen
- Zurich Zoo
