= Bahnhofbrücke, Zurich =

Bahnhofbrücke
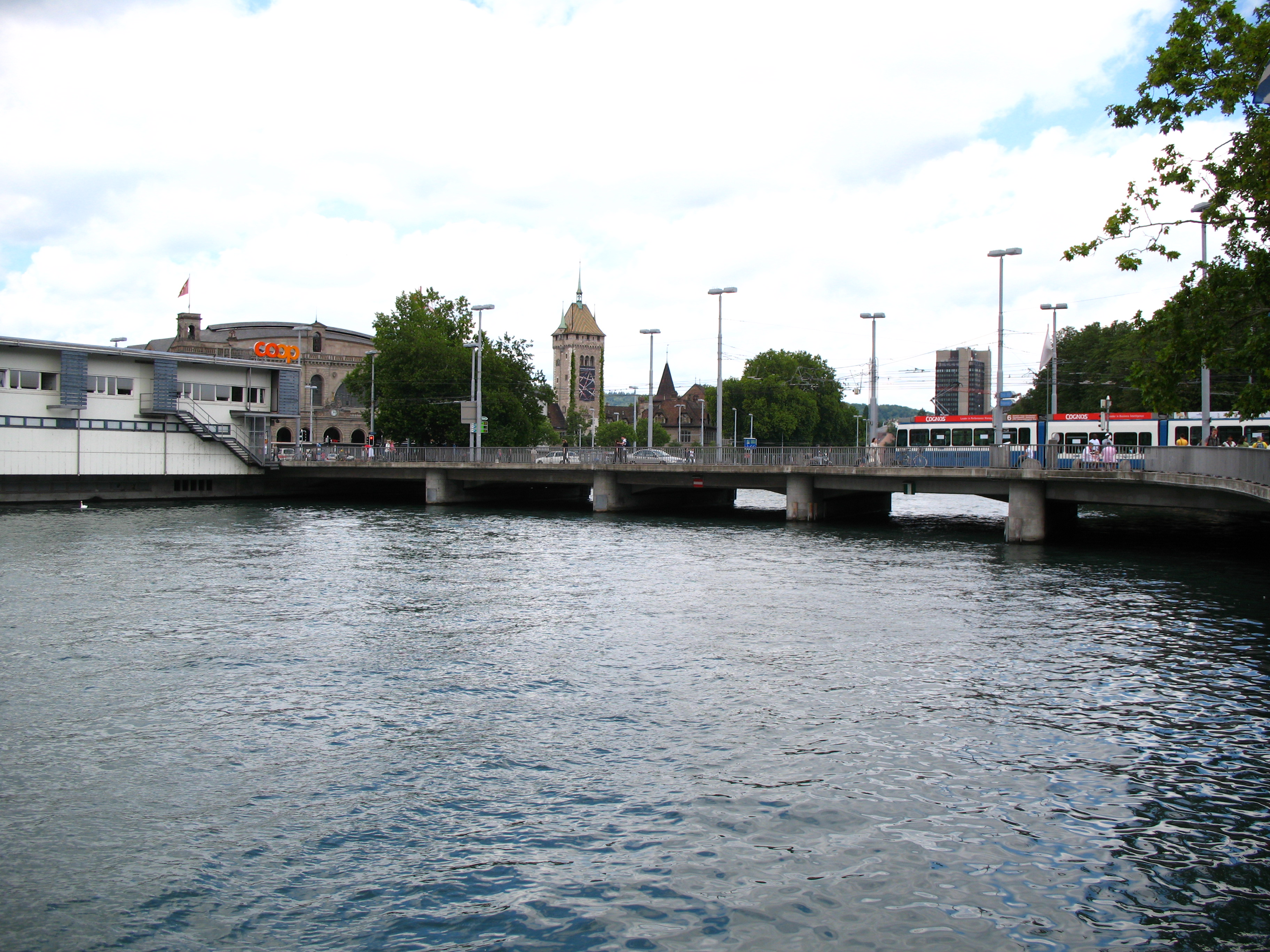
- Bahnhofbrücke seen from the upstream side
- Coordinates: 47°22′37″N 8°32′34″E
- Carries: Two lanes for road traffic, two tram railways and sidewalks
- Crosses: Limmat
- Locale: Central, Zürich, Switzerland
- Official name: Bahnhofbrücke
- ID number: 145

Characteristics
- No. of spans: 4

History
- Construction end: 1847 (178 years ago)

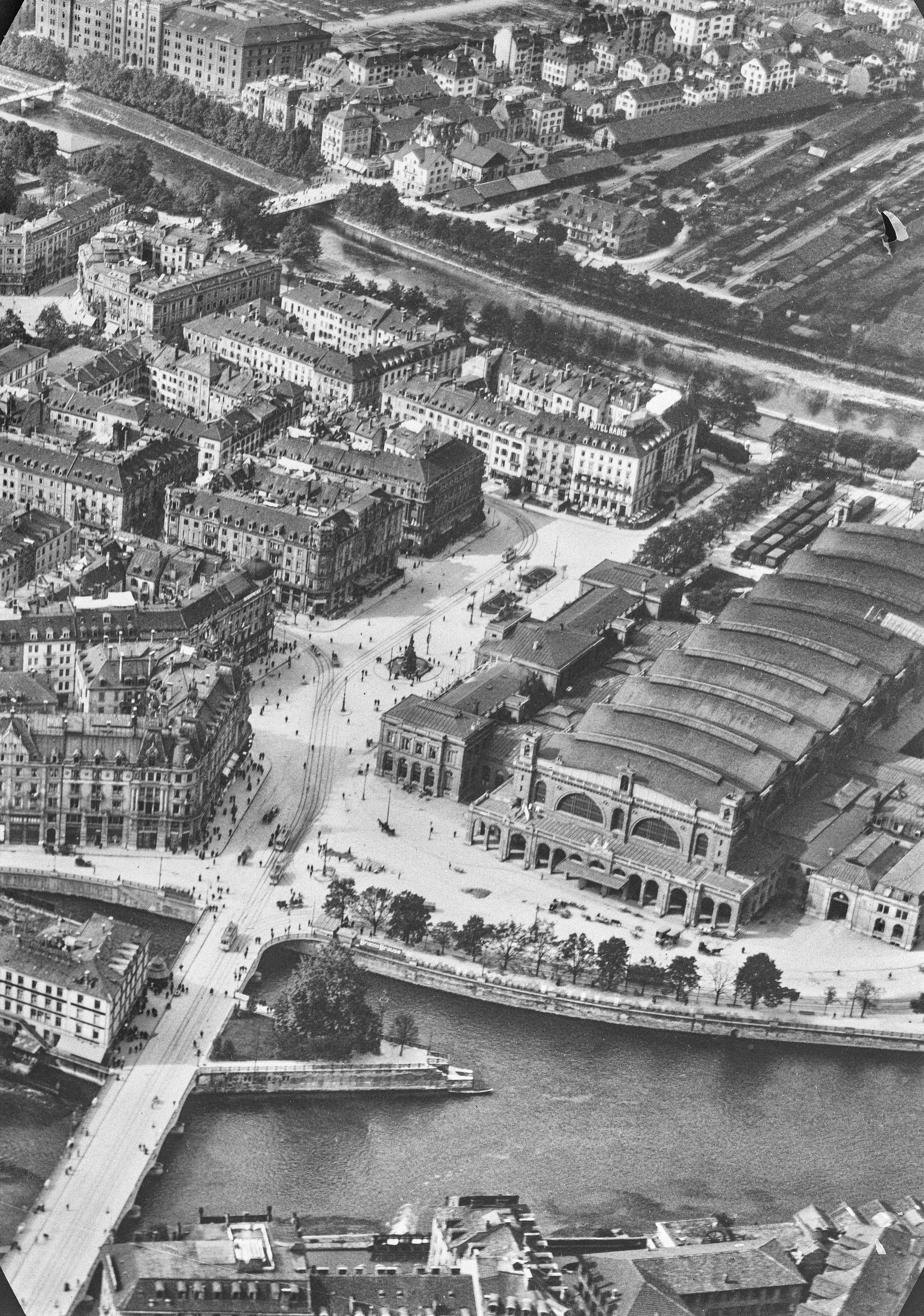
Aerial photograph by Eduard Spelterini in the probably late 1890s

Bahnhofbrücke (lit. 'railway station bridge') is a road and tramway bridge over the river Limmat in Zurich, Switzerland.

== Geography ==
Bahnhofbrücke means 'railway station bridge' in German, referring to the adjacent main railway station of Zurich which is situated outside of the city's historical core of the medieval town. The bridge crosses the left-hand (western) and right-hand (eastern) bank of the Limmat, opposite of Zürich Hauptbahnhof (Zürich HB) and Platzspitz park, and connects them with the Central square, Limmatquai and the City and Unterstrass quarters.

== Transportation ==
The Zurich tram lines 3, 4, 6, 7, 10 and 15, and the local VBZ bus lines 31, 33, 34 and 46 provide public transportation, as well as Zürichsee-Schifffahrtsgesellschaft (ZSG) and its Limmat tour boats towards Zürichhorn and Landesmuseum. Private road transport towards Limmatquai, the largest pedestrian zone of Zurich, is restricted to the short roadway towards the Brunbrücke and Uraniastrasse (Urania Sternwarte) at the site of the former Oetenbach nunnery; and also road transport between Central–Bahnhofbrücke and the Bahnhofquai and Bahnhofplatz squares is allowed.

== History ==
The construction works started in 1847, named in 1863, and in 1871 it was extended according to the plans of Gottfried Semper by the architect F. Wanner. Redesigns of the Central–Bahnhofbrücke area occurred in 1950–51.

== Literature ==
- Das Limmatquai vor und nach der Neugestaltung. Aufenthaltsnutzung, Fuss- und Veloverkehrsaufkommen im Vergleich der Jahre 2004-2005-2008. Published by Tiefbau- und Entsorgungsdepartement der Stadt Zürich, Zürich 2009.

== See also ==
- List of bridges in Switzerland
