= Central, Zurich =

Public square in Zurich, Switzerland

Central
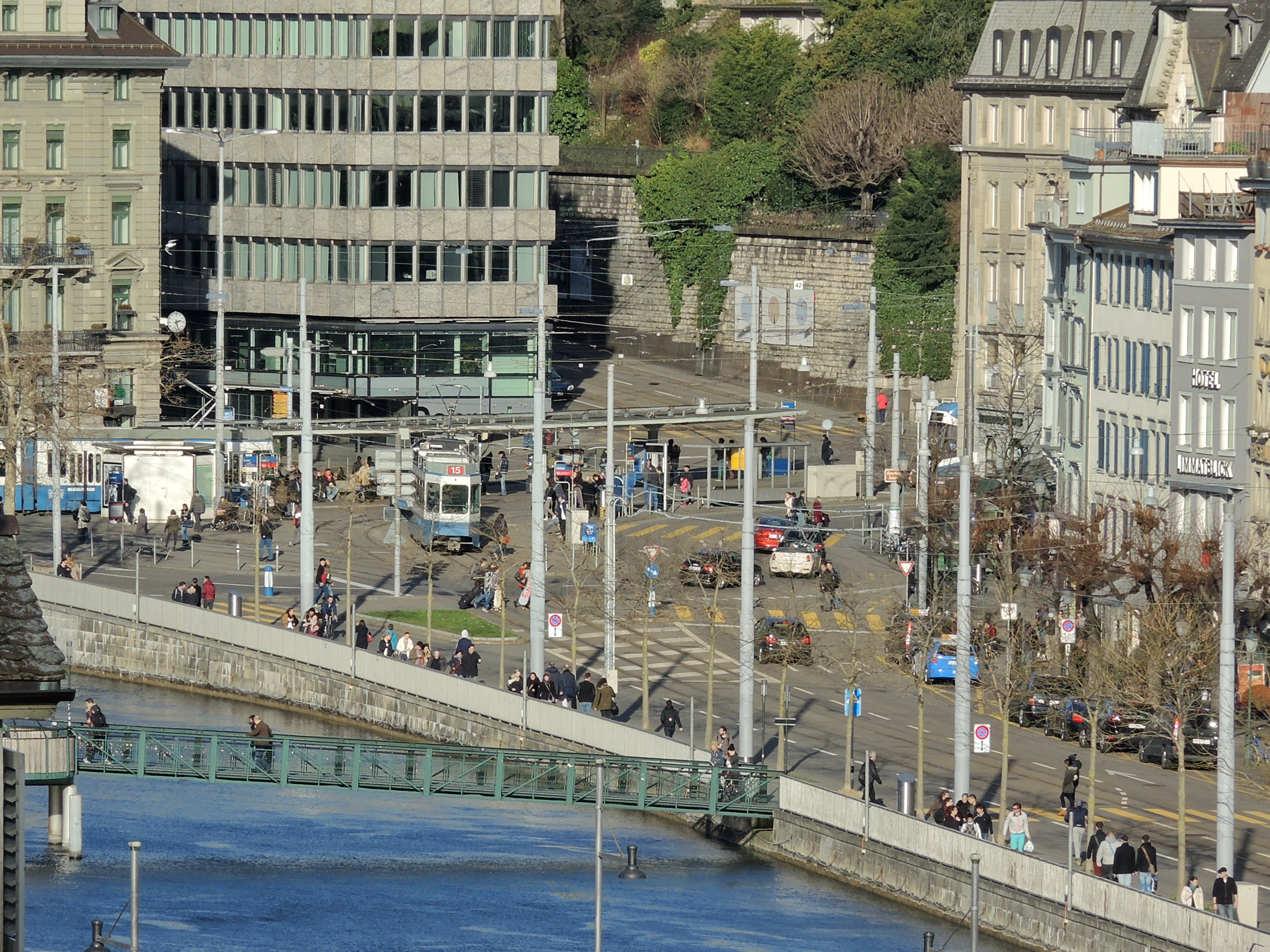
- Central as seen from the Lindenhof hill, Bahnhofbrücke to the left.
- Interactive map of Central
- Former name(s): Leonhardplatz, Leonhardsplatz
- Type: tramway, road, pedestrian
- Owner: City of Zürich
- Addresses: Central
- Location: Zürich, Switzerland
- Postal code: 8001
- Coordinates: 47.377°N 8.544°E

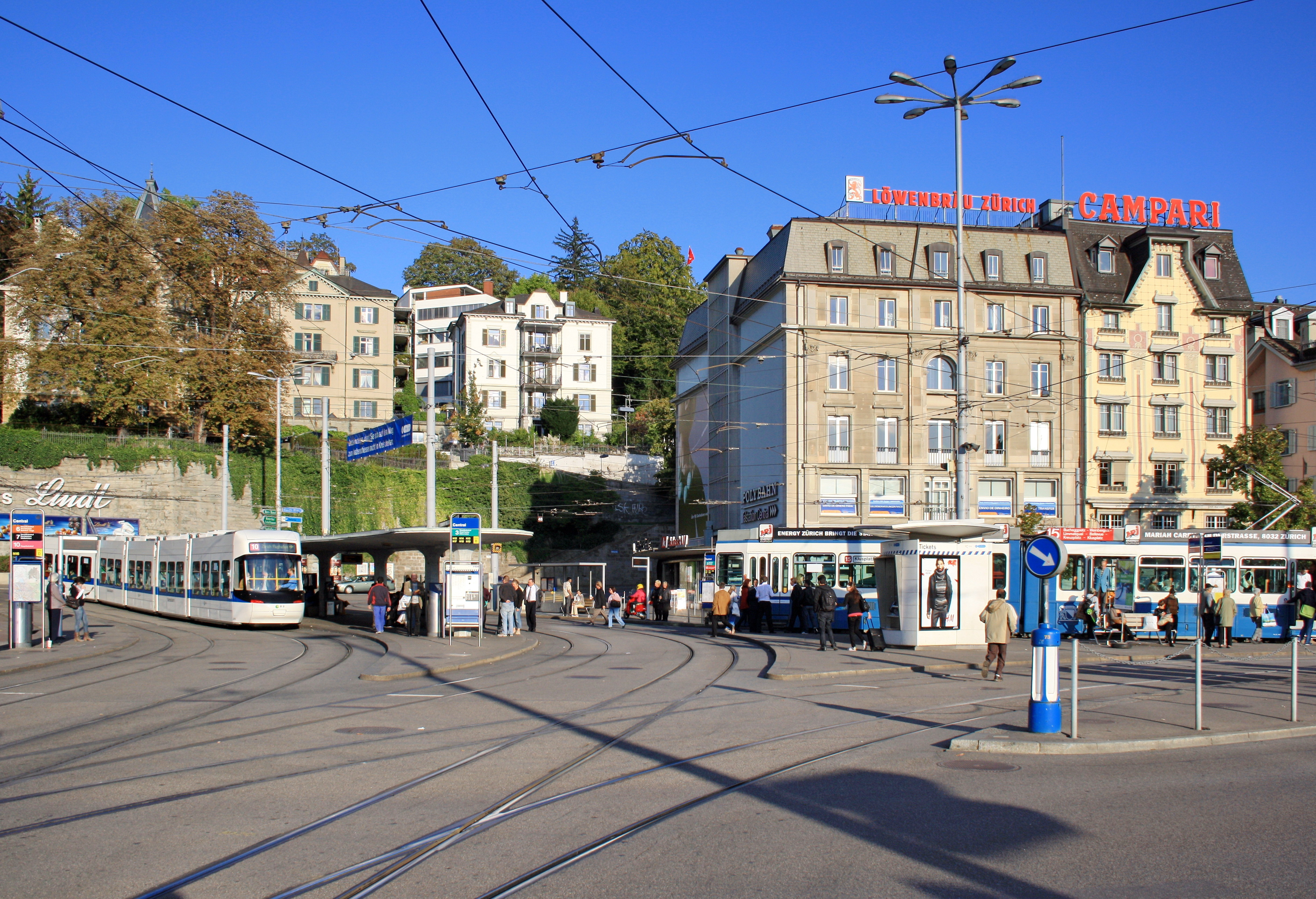
Central as seen from Bahnhofbrücke

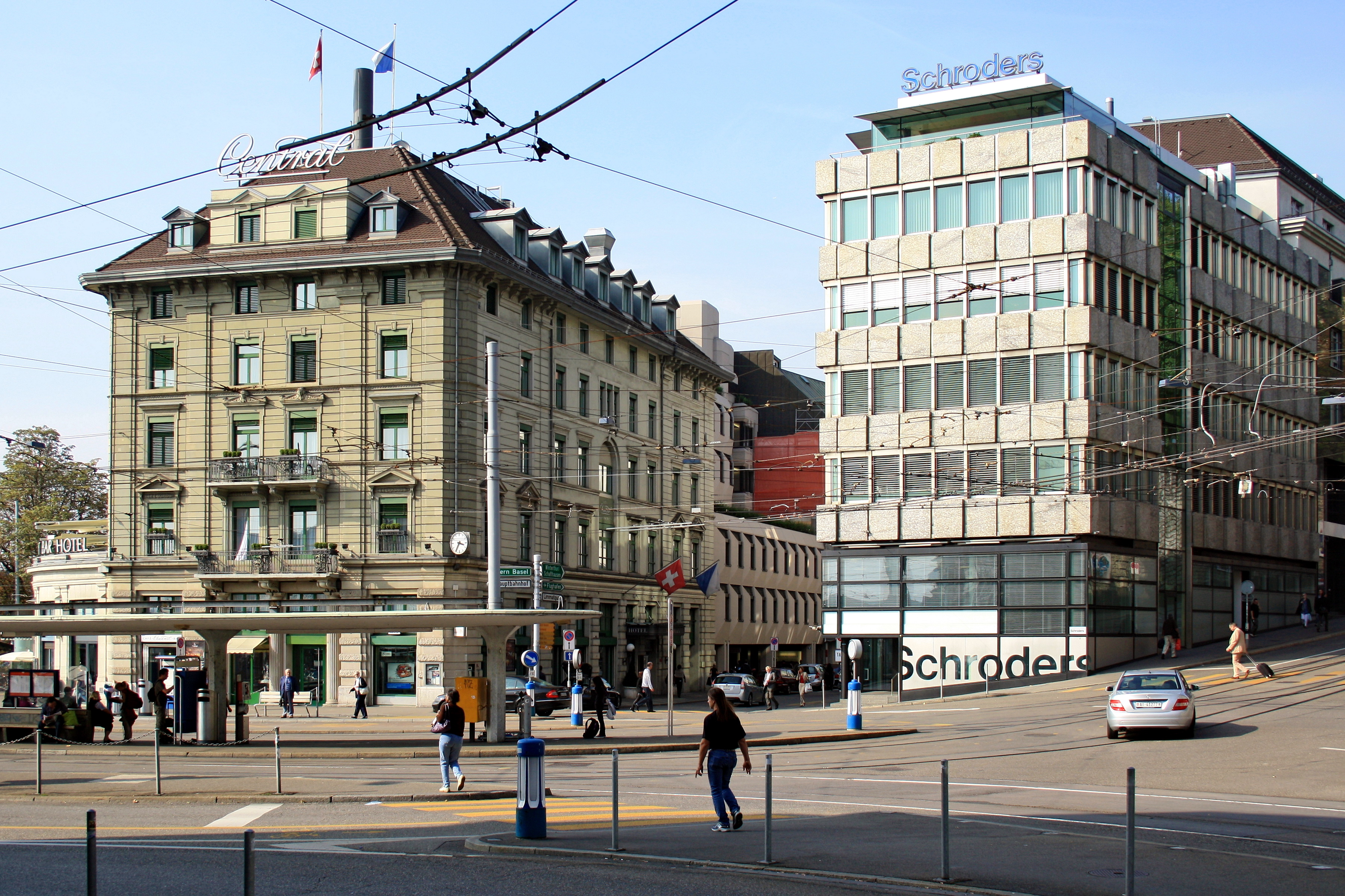
Hotel Central

Central is a public square at the northern end of Limmatquai in Zürich, Switzerland. It is one of the city's public transport nodes, housing an interchange station for tram and bus lines run by the Verkehrsbetriebe Zürich. It was formerly known as Leonhardplatz or Leonhardsplatz.

== Geography ==
Central is in fact outside of the historical core of the medieval town of Zürich, previously the Celtic-Roman Turicum. It is situated at the right-hand (eastern) bank of the Limmat, the principal river flowing through the city of Zürich. It is opposite of the Zürich Hauptbahnhof and connected by Bahnhofbrücke, a road and tramway bridge crossing the Limmat, and connecting Rathaus and Lindenhof respectively the City and Unterstrass quarters. Situated nearby the historical Neumarkt and Niederdorf, the most remarkable landmark is the Prediger church. The former Leonhardplatz is named after the Central hotel situated there. The Seilergraben, Weinbergstrasse, Neumühlequai and Stampfenbachstrasse gather at the square. Redesigns of the Central–Bahnhofbrücke area occurred in 1950/51.

== Transportation ==
Leonhardsplatz, as it was known then, first became a node in Zürich's transport system in 1889, when the Polybahn funicular was opened up the hill to the Polytechnikum, the present ETH Zurich. In 1897, the Strassenbahn Zürich-Oerlikon-Seebach (ZOS) company made Leonhardsplatz the city terminus of their suburban tram line via Stampfenbachstrasse and Schaffhauserstrasse to Oerlikon and Seebach. Passengers were required to change at Leonhardsplatz for the separate city tramway system until 1931, when the ZOS was taken over by the Städtische Strassenbahn Zürich, who operated the city's trams.

Today, the Zurich tram lines 3, 4, 6, 7, 10 and 15, and VBZ trolleybus lines 31 and 46 provide public transportation. The Polybahn also still operates over its original route.

Private road transport towards Limmatquai, the largest pedestrian zone of Zurich, is restricted to the short roadway towards the Brun bridge and Uraniastrasse (Urania Sternwarte) at the site of the former Oetenbach nunnery. Since 25 September 2004, the driving of motor vehicles, motorcycles and scooters is forbidden, except for goods transport, traffic towards Weinplatz, postal delivery services, and doctors and emergency services.

== Literature ==
- Das Limmatquai vor und nach der Neugestaltung. Aufenthaltsnutzung, Fuss- und Veloverkehrsaufkommen im Vergleich der Jahre 2004-2005-2008. Published by Tiefbau- und Entsorgungsdepartement der Stadt Zürich, Zürich 2009.
