= Barfüsserkloster =

Franciscan friary in Zurich, Switzerland

Coordinates: 47.3717°N 8.5468°E

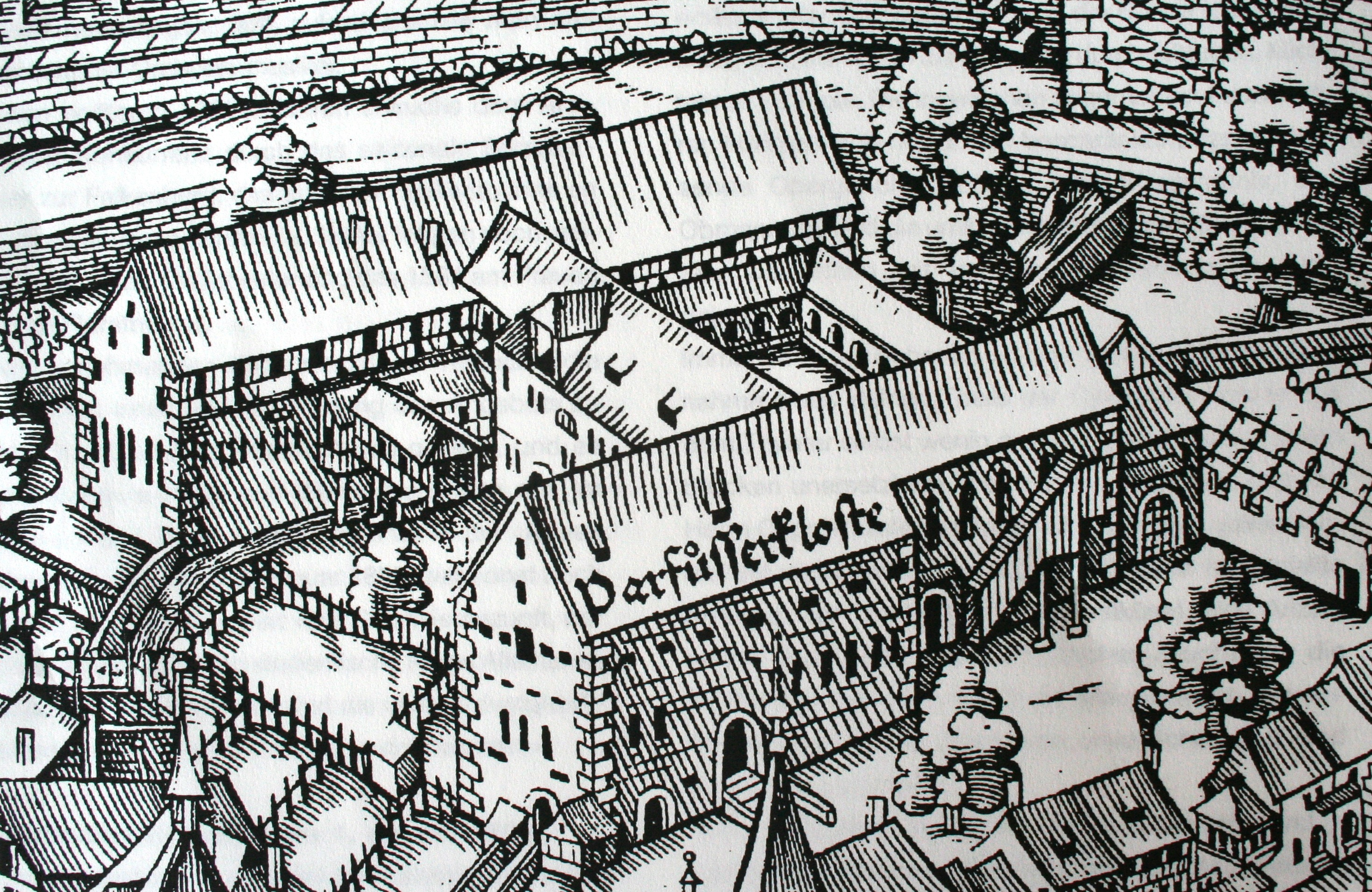
The Barfüsserkloster on the 1576 Murerplan

The Barfüsserkloster in the old town of Zurich is a former Franciscan friary. It was first attested in the 1240s and was dissolved during the Reformation, in 1524. The friary was situated in the southeastern corner of the medieval city, between the Neumarkt and the Linden gates (today at Hirschengraben 13/15).

After the Reformation, the buildings were used as a grain depot, and during the early 19th century, as a casino. During the 19th century, most of the original structure was lost to significant construction work. The buildings since the 1870s have housed the cantonal court of law (Obergericht), besides the communal wine cellars and a theater. After a fire in 1890, part of the structure was removed, and is now a parking lot. The cantonal court remains the only occupant of the estate.

== Bibliography ==
- Regine Abegg, Christine Barraud Wiener, Karl Grunder: Die Kunstdenkmäler des Kantons Zürich, Altstadt rechts der Limmat, Sakralbauten. Neue Ausgabe Band III.I, Gesellschaft für Schweizerische Kunstgeschichte, Bern 2002 ISBN 978-3-906131-86-3
- Urs Amacher: Die Bruderschaften bei den Zürcher Bettelordensklöstern. – In: Bettelorden, Bruderschaften und Beginen in Zürich: Stadtkultur und Seelenheil im Mittelalter (ed. Barbara Helbling et al.), Verlag Neue Zürcher Zeitung, Zurich 2002, pp. 265–277 ISBN 3-85823-970-4
- Erwin Eugster: Geschichte des Barfüsserklosters. – In: Bettelorden, Bruderschaften und Beginen in Zürich: Stadtkultur und Seelenheil im Mittelalter (ed. Barbara Helbling et al.), Verlag Neue Zürcher Zeitung, Zurich 2002, pp. 44–55 ISBN 3-85823-970-4
- Thomas Germann: Zürich im Zeitraffer, Band II, Werd, Zurich 2002 ISBN 3-85932-332-6
- Ulrich Helfenstein: Barfüsserkloster Zürich. - In: Helvetia sacra, Abt. 5: Der Franziskusorden. Francke, Bern 1978, Bd. 1 pp. 300–308
- Sigmund Widmer: Zürich – eine Kulturgeschichte, Band 3; Artemis, Zurich 1976 ISBN 3-7608-0682-1
- Dölf Wild: Zur Baugeschichte des Zürcher Barfüsserklosters. – In: Bettelorden, Bruderschaften und Beginen in Zürich: Stadtkultur und Seelenheil im Mittelalter, (ed. Barbara Helbling et al.), Verlag Neue Zürcher Zeitung, Zurich 2002, pp. 56–68 ISBN 3-85823-970-4
