= Lindenhof =

Quarter of the city of Zurich, Switzerland

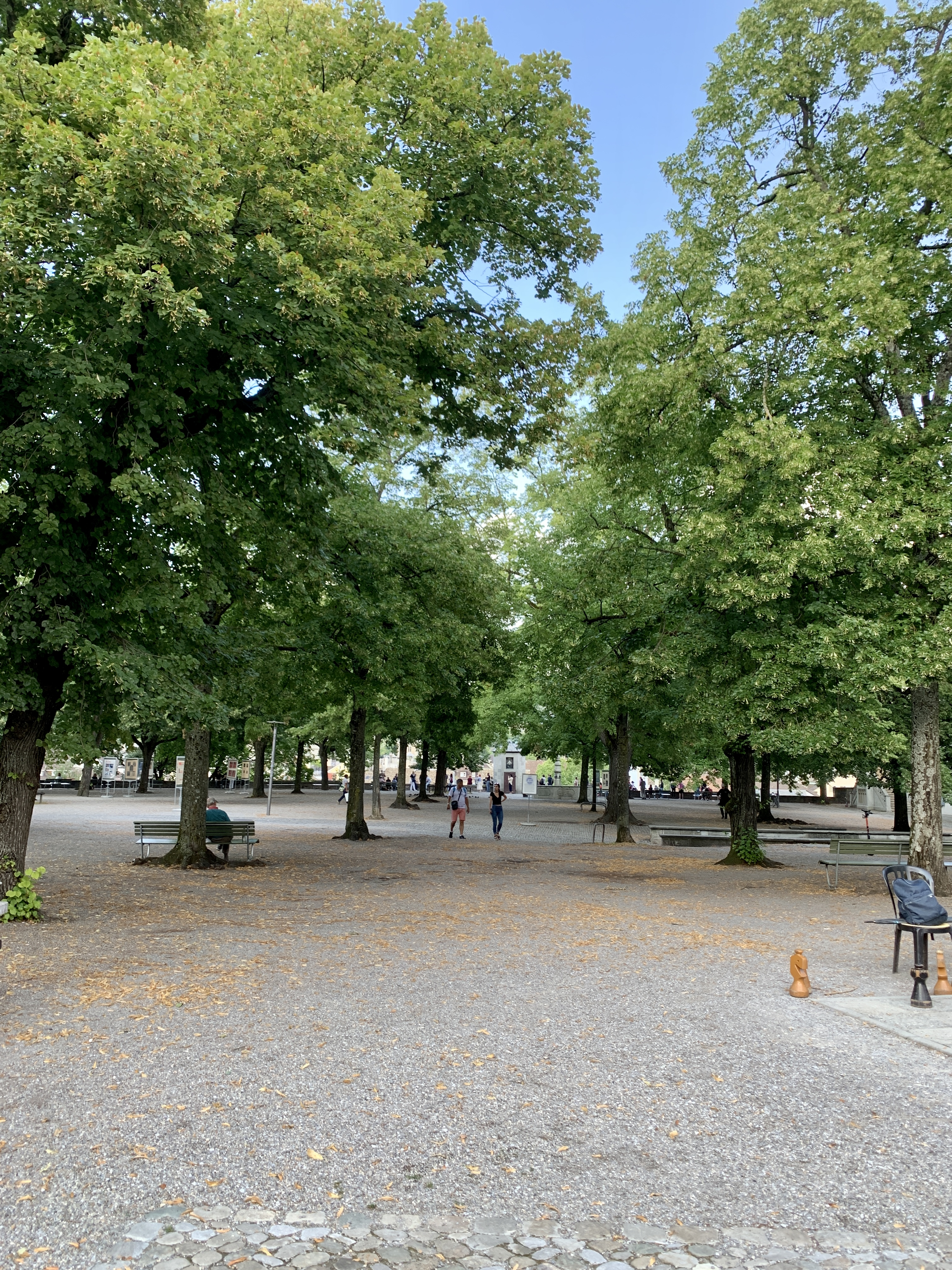
- Lindenhof in 2019, looking east
- Interactive map of Lindenhof
- Location: Zurich, Switzerland
- Coordinates: 47.3730°N 8.5412°E
- North: Lindenhofstrasse
- South: Pfalzgasse

Lindenhof, lit. 'Tilia Courtyard', in the old town of Zurich, Switzerland, is the historical site of a Roman castle, and the later Carolingian Kaiserpfalz. It is situated on Lindenhof hill, on the left side of the Limmat river at the Schipfe.

In 1747, a second-century Roman tombstone was discovered at the site, bearing the oldest attestation of Turīcum, the Roman-era name of Zurich, as STA[tio] TURIC[ensis], at the time a tax-collection point. The castle remained intact during the early phase of Alemannic immigration in between the fifth and sixth centuries, but was derelict by the ninth century, when it was rebuilt as a residence for Louis the German. It later became dilapidated and used as a source of building stone by the 13th century.

The Lindenhof remained a place of civil assembly into modern times. In 1798, the citizens of Zurich swore the oath to the constitution of the Helvetic Republic on the Lindenhof.

In 1851, the Modestia cum Libertate Masonic Lodge (established in 1771) bought the residence Zum Paradies and built a masonic building on the southern side of the square.

In the early 21st century, it serves as a recreational space, a green oasis, and automobile-free zone in the old historic city centre. Its elevated position makes it a popular location for tourists to get an overview of the geography of old Zurich.

In April, during the local holiday of Sechseläuten, the Lindenhof serves as the base of operations for whichever is the "guest canton" for that year.

== Gallery ==
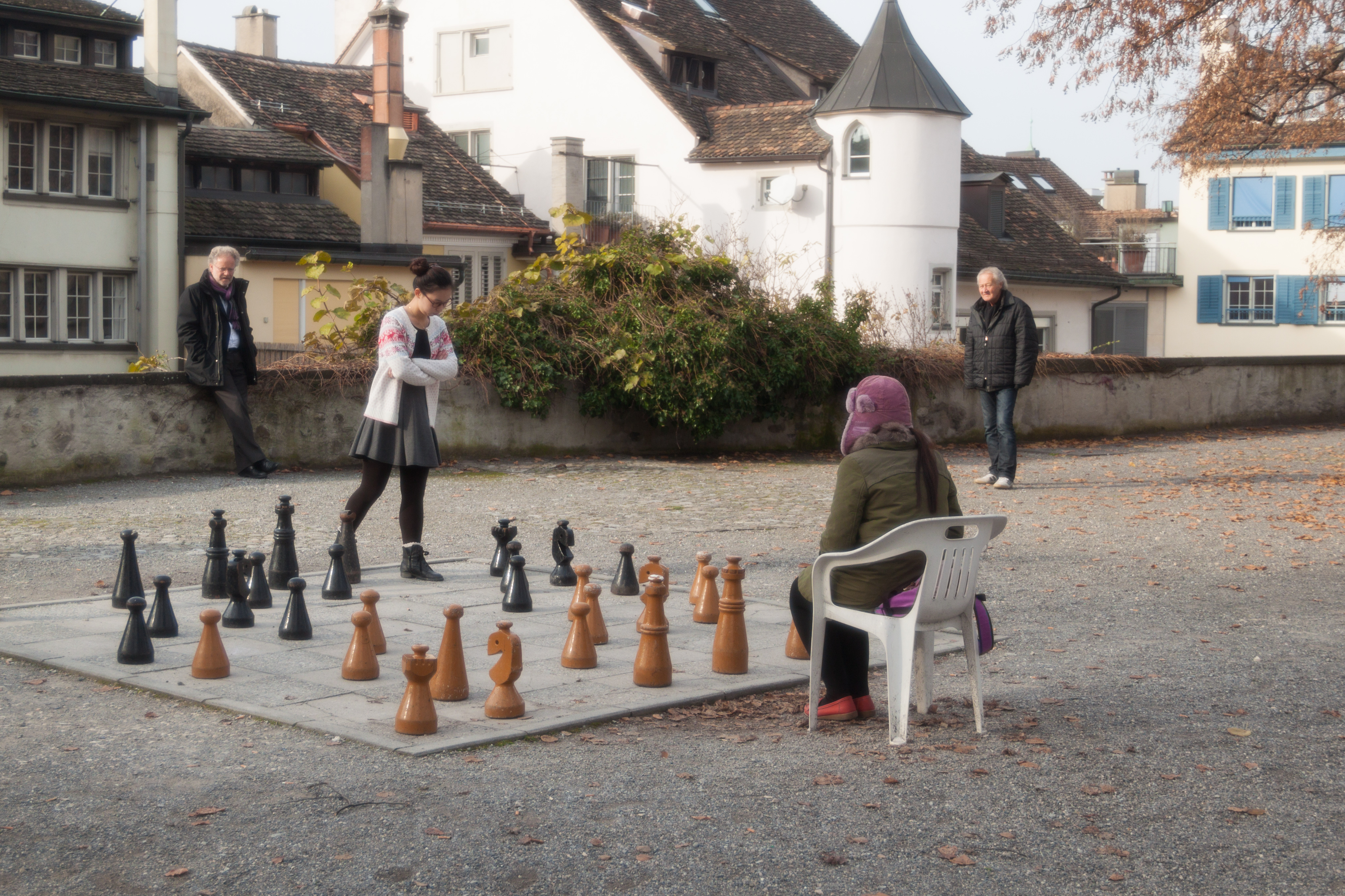
Lindenhof's chess board (2012)

== Literature ==
- Präsidialdepartement der Stadt Zürich, Statistik Stadt Zürich: Quartierspiegel Lindenhof. Zurich 2006 (PDF; 2.77 MB)

== See also ==
- History of Zurich
