= Polybahn =

Funicular in the city of Zurich, Switzerland

Coordinates: 47°22′35″N 8°32′38″E

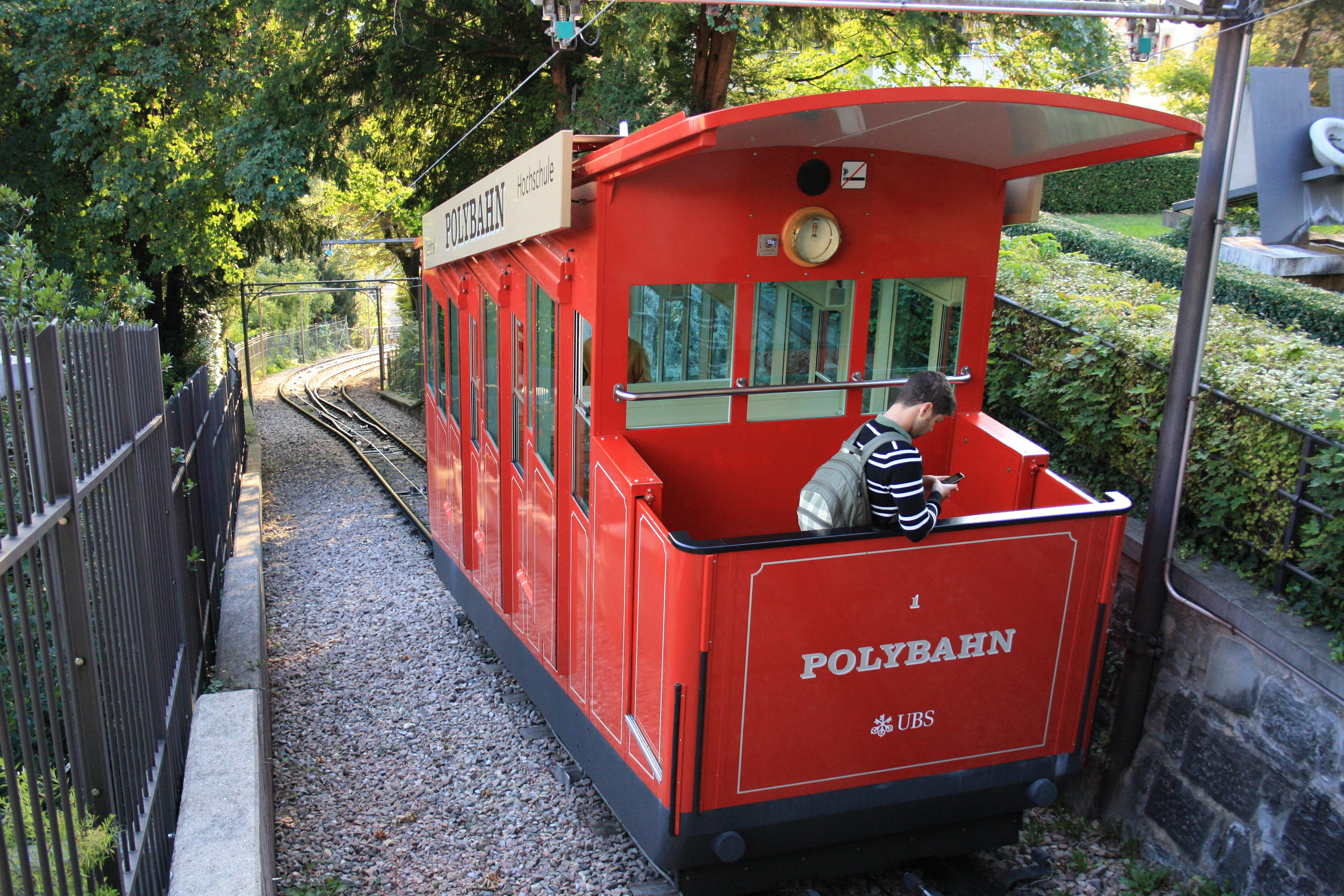

Overview
- Other name(s): Zürichbergbahn; Seilbahn Limmatquai–Hochschulen
- Status: In operation
- Owner: UBS-Polybahn AG (since 1998); SBG-Polybahn AG (1976–1998, name change); Zürichbergbahn-Gesellschaft (1889–1976)
- Locale: City of Zurich, Switzerland
- Termini: "Central (Polybahn)" near Zürich Hauptbahnhof; "Polyterrasse" at Leonhardstrasse/ETH main building
- Stations: 2
- Website: polybahn.ch

Service
- Type: Funicular
- Route number: 2700
- Operator: Verkehrsbetriebe Zürich
- Rolling stock: 2 for 50 passengers each

History
- Opened: 8 January 1889; 137 years ago
- Single-track: 1996

Technical
- Track length: 176 metres (577 ft)
- Num of tracks: 1 with passing loop
- Rack system: (before 1996: Abt)
- Track gauge: 955 mm (3 ft 1 19/32 in)
- Electrification: 1897 (water counterbalancing before)
- Operating speed: 2.5 metres per second (8.2 ft/s)
- Highest elevation: 450 m (1,480 ft)
- Maximum incline: 26% (avg. 23%)

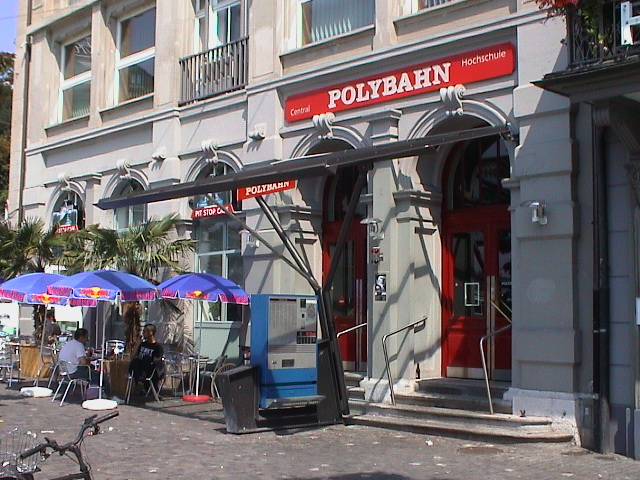
Entrance to the lower station of the Polybahn at the Central square

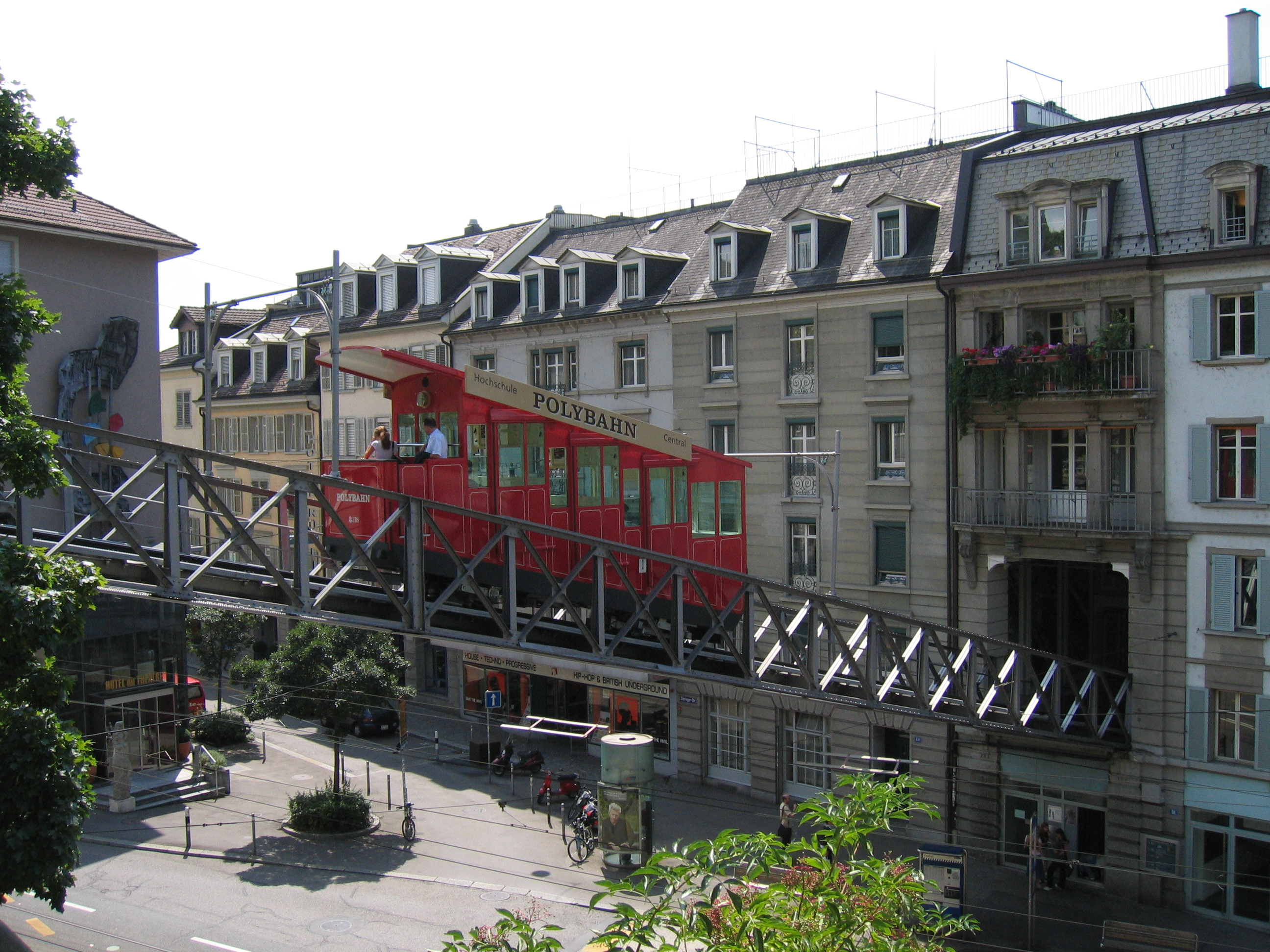
Car leaving the lower station across the viaduct over Seilergraben

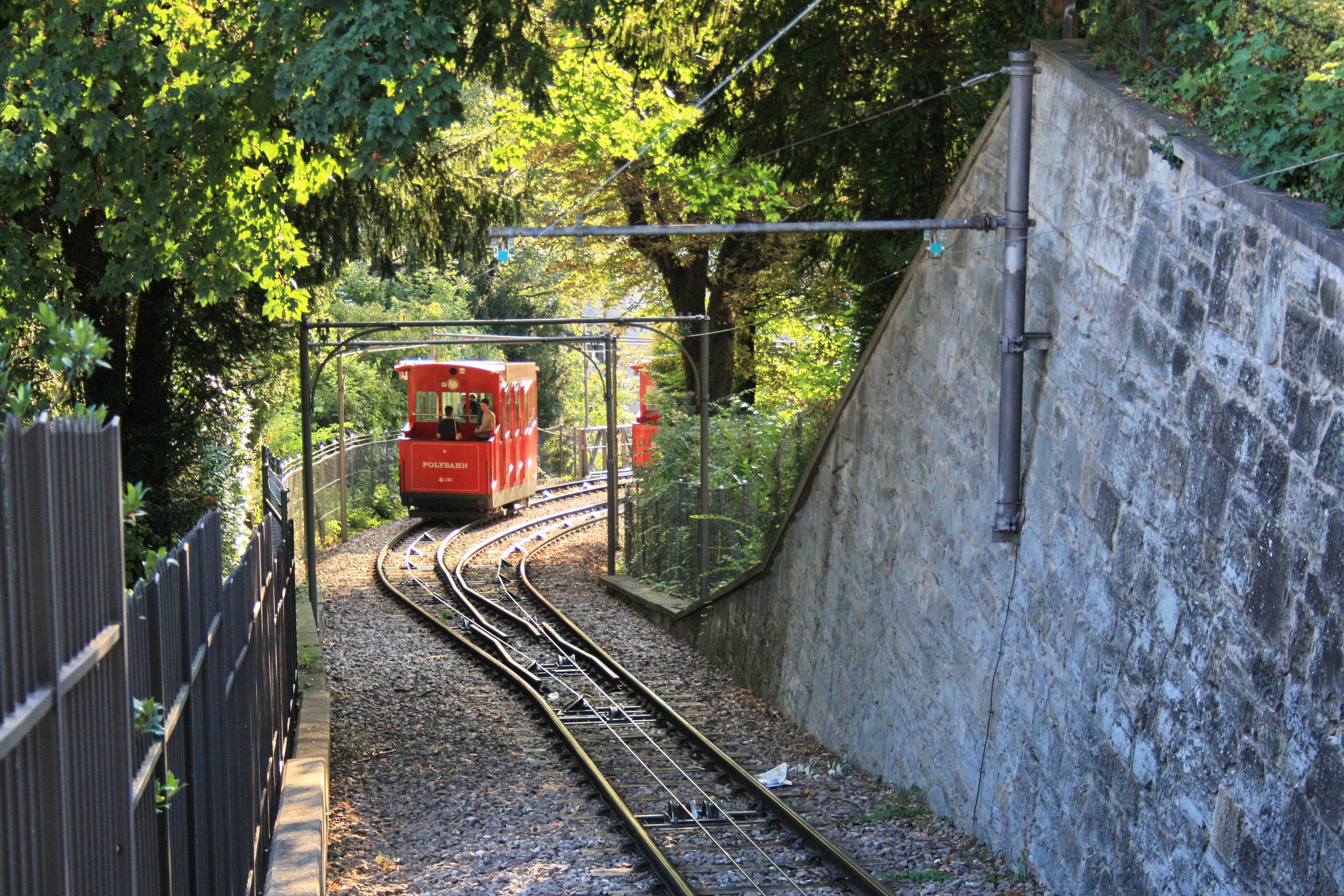
The passing loop above the viaduct

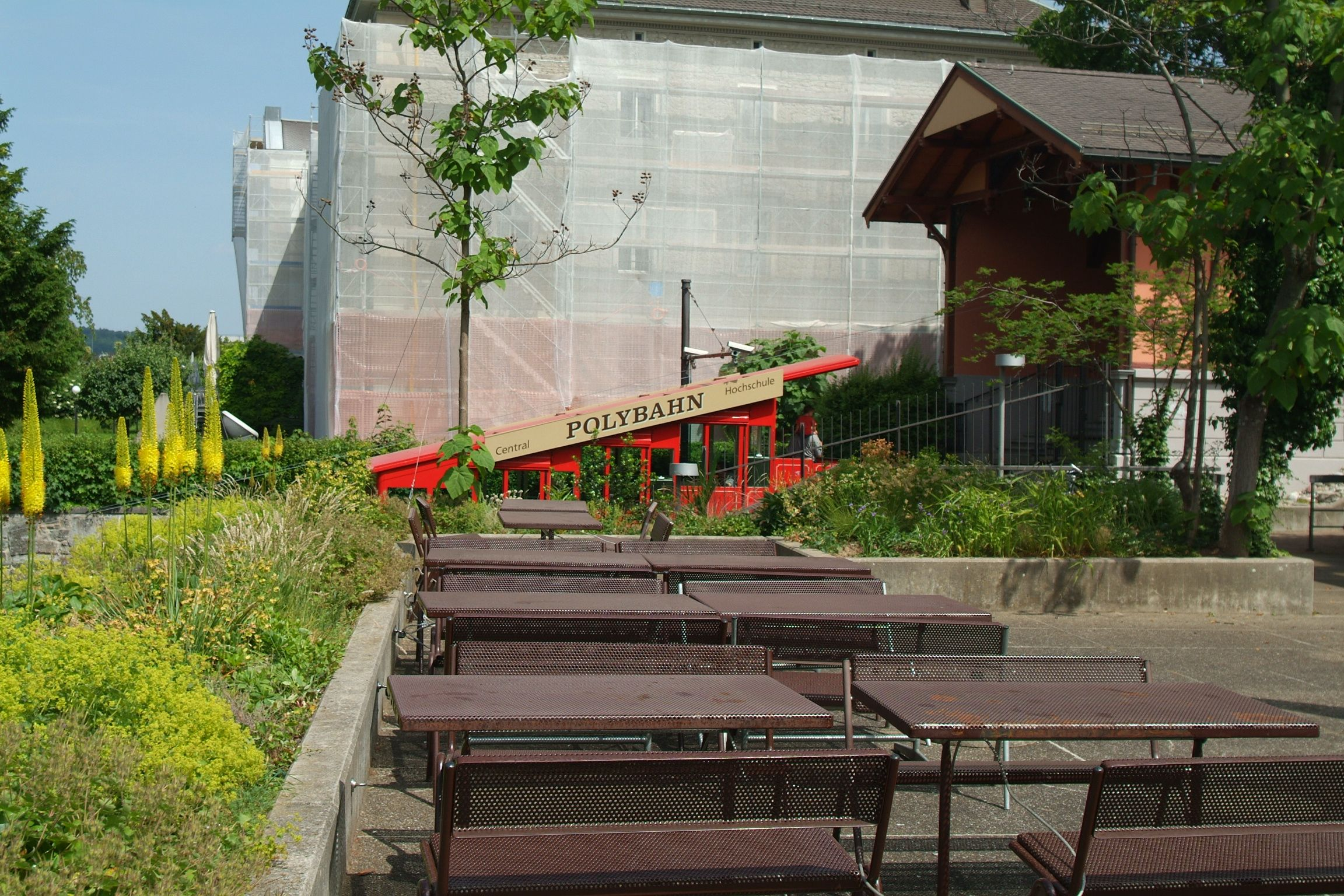
Car approaching upper station

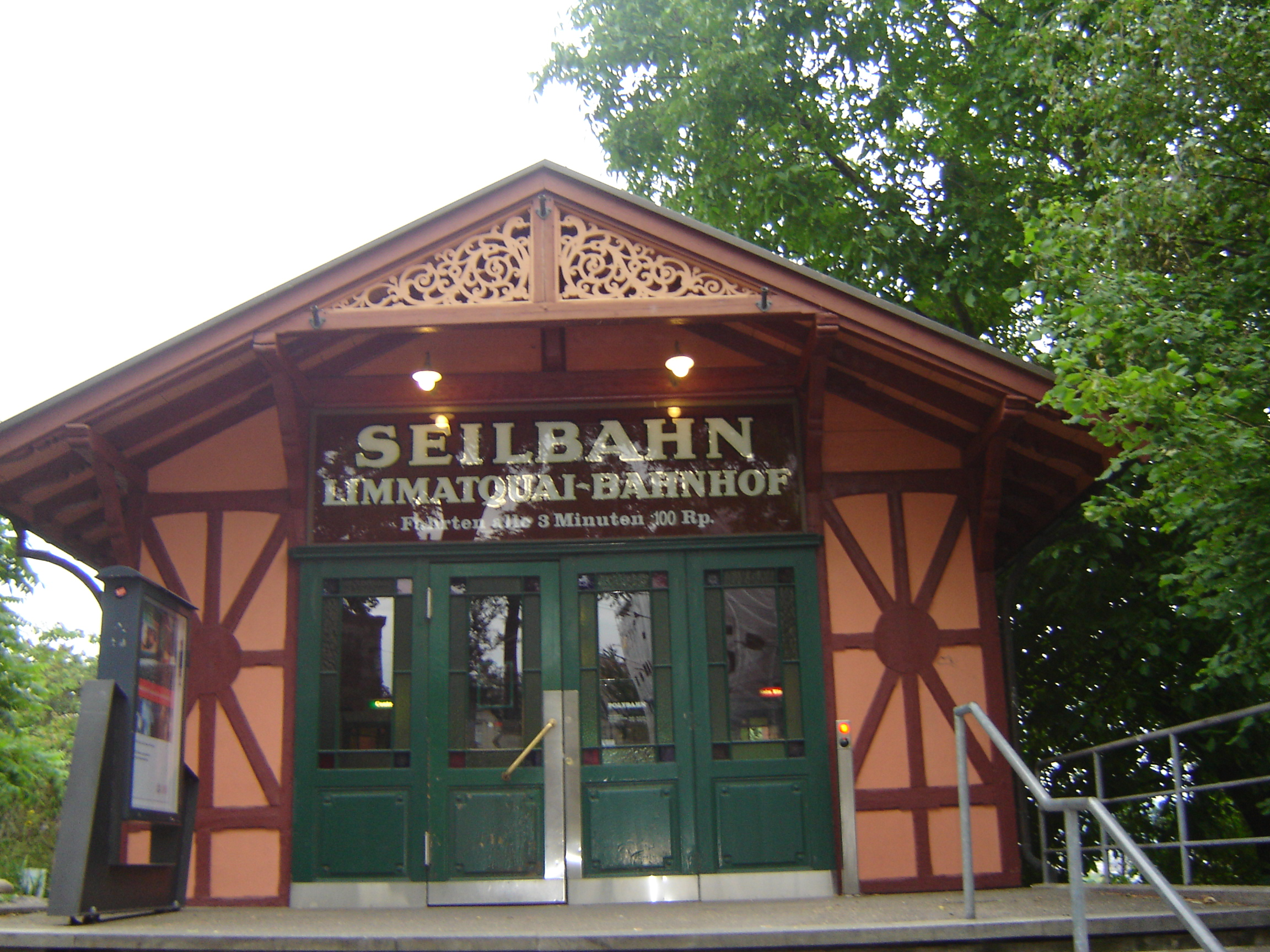
Entrance to the upper station

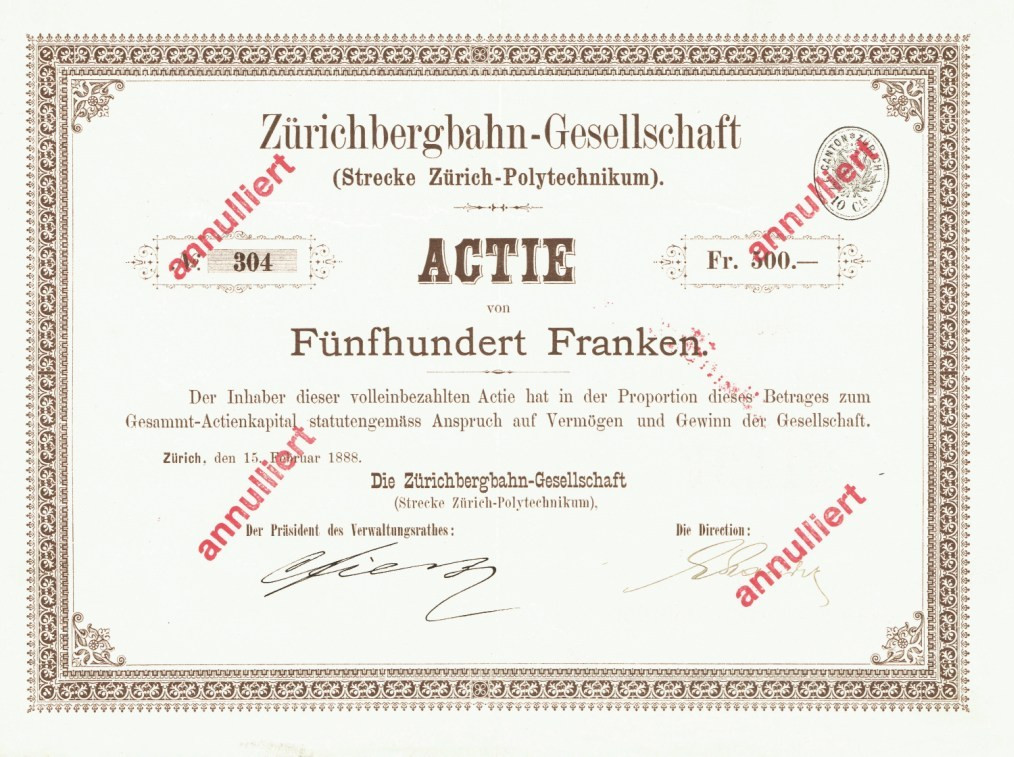
Share of the Zürichbergbahn-Gesellschaft, issued 15. February 1888

The Polybahn, also known as the UBS Polybahn, is a funicular in the city of Zurich, Switzerland. The line links the Central square with the terrace (Polyterrasse) by the main building of ETH Zurich, which was formerly called Eidgenössisches Polytechnikum, and from which the railway derives its name. The top station is also close to the Natural History Museum.

Previous names for the line include the SBG Polybahn and the Zürichbergbahn. The line is owned by the banking group UBS AG, and operated on their behalf by the municipal transport operator Verkehrsbetriebe Zürich.

The Polybahn is one of two funiculars within the city of Zurich, the other being the Rigiblick funicular in the city's northern suburbs. Additionally, the city's Dolderbahn rack railway was originally a funicular, until its conversion to rack working in the 1970s.

== History ==
In 1886 a concession for the railway was issued, and the line was opened by the Zürichbergbahn company in 1889. The funicular was initially water-driven (filling water in a ballast tank under the carriage at the top station, emptying at the bottom); the railway was converted to electric drive in 1897.

In 1950 the Zürichbergbahn company began losing money, and eventually (in the 1970s) decided not to renew the concession. In 1972 a foundation was created to help preserve the Polybahn. In 1976 the Union Bank of Switzerland, then known in German as the Schweizerische Bankgesellschaft or SBG, rescued the Polybahn, branding it as the SBG Polybahn. The line and cars were refurbished for a planned 20 more years service.

In 1996 the railway was completely rebuilt. The haulage mechanism was replaced, and fully automated, whilst the old three-rail tracks were replaced with the current two-rail tracks. On 21 October 1996 the railway reopened and is now advertised under the name UBS Polybahn, reflecting the rebranding (in 1998) of the owning banking group as UBS AG. In 1998 the line set a new record, carrying more than 2 million passengers.

On 30 May 2021 the Polybahn was closed for refurbishment, with the cars being removed by crane. The Polybahn reopened on 17 September 2021.

== Operation ==
The line has the following parameters:

Feature	Value
Number of cars	2
Number of stops	2
Configuration	Single track with passing loop
Mode of operation	Automated
Drive	Three-phase AC motor with frequency changer
Track length	176 metres (577 ft)
Rise	41 metres (135 ft)
Average gradient	23%
Track gauge	955 mm (3 ft 1 19/32 in)
Capacity	50 persons per car
Maximum speed	2.5 metres per second (8.2 ft/s)
Capacity per direction	1200 Persons/hour
Travel time	100 seconds
Frequency	Every 2.5 minutes

The standard Zürcher Verkehrsverbund zonal fare tariffs apply, with the whole of the line being within fare zone 110 (formerly zone 10; Zurich city). A special Polybahn ticket is also available; it costs less than the regular 110 fare.

== See also ==
- Public transport in Zurich
- List of funicular railways
- List of funiculars in Switzerland
