= Urania Sternwarte =

Public observatory in Zurich

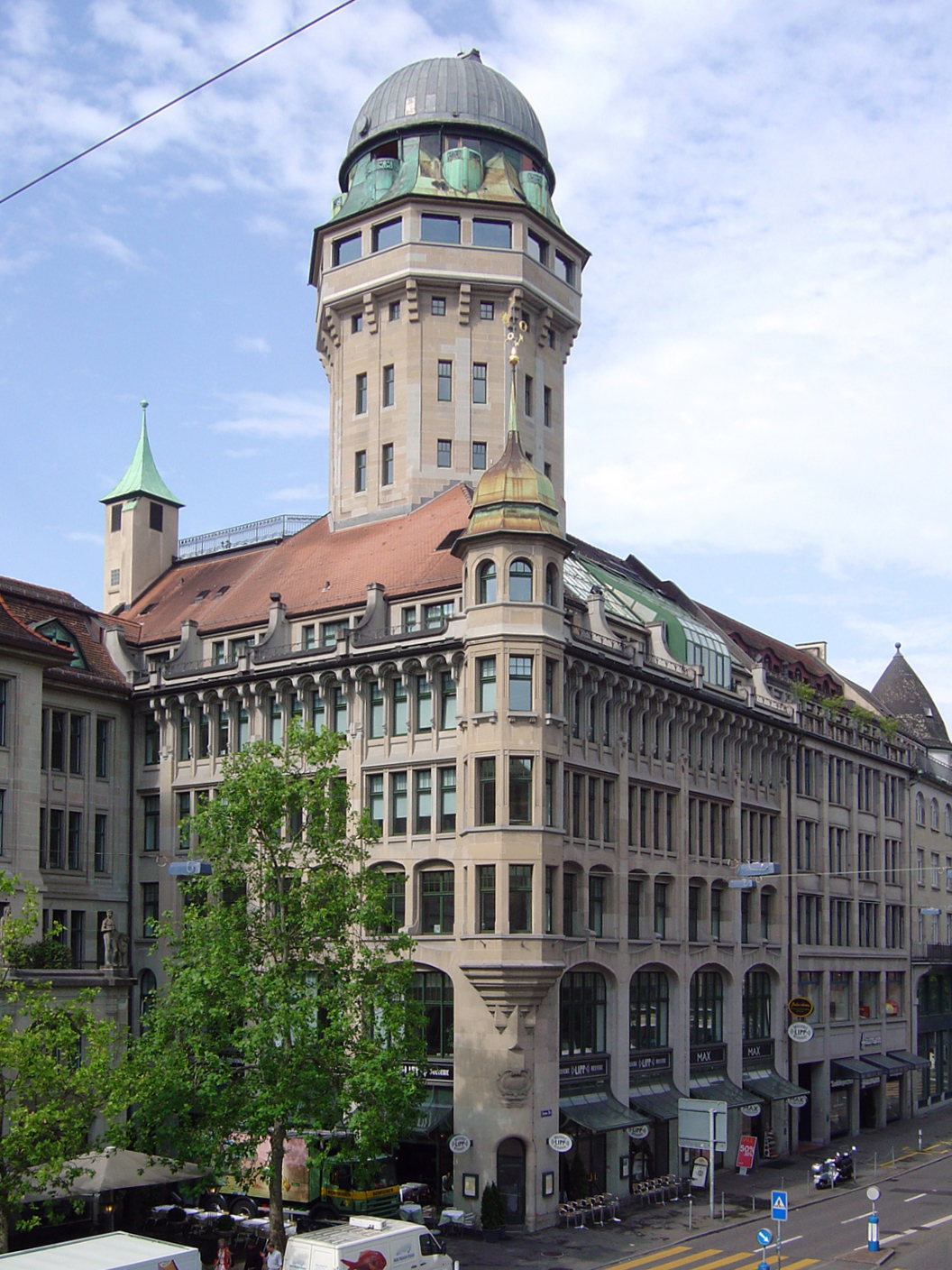
- Organization: Urania-Sternwarte Zürich AG
- Location: Zurich, Switzerland
- Coordinates: 47.3744°N 8.5395°E
- Established: 1907
- Website: www.urania-sternwarte.ch
- Related media on Commons

Urania Sternwarte is a public observatory in the Lindenhof quarter of Zurich, Switzerland. Its name Urania refers to the muse of astronomy in Greek mythology. It features a restaurant (main building) and a bar with panoramic view (tower).

== History ==
Its origins base on a first observatory on the roof of the Zunfthaus zur Meisen. In 1759, so called «Astronomische Kommission» succeeded from this location for the first time, to define Culminatio solis and thus calculated the exact global location of the city of Zurich. In later years, astronomical observations were done from the Grossmünster's southern "Karl's tower", followed by scientific observations (not for public use by interested enthusiasts) from the Federal observatory, built 1861/64 for ETH Zurich by Gottfried Semper.

In 1899, the Zurich merchant Abraham Weill Einstein initiated the oldest observatory in Switzerland, situated near Werdmühleplatz (Uraniastrasse). On June 15, 1907, the observatory was given to operational use. Its 51 metres (167 ft) tower dominates the western end of Zurich's historic Altstadt.

== Telescope ==
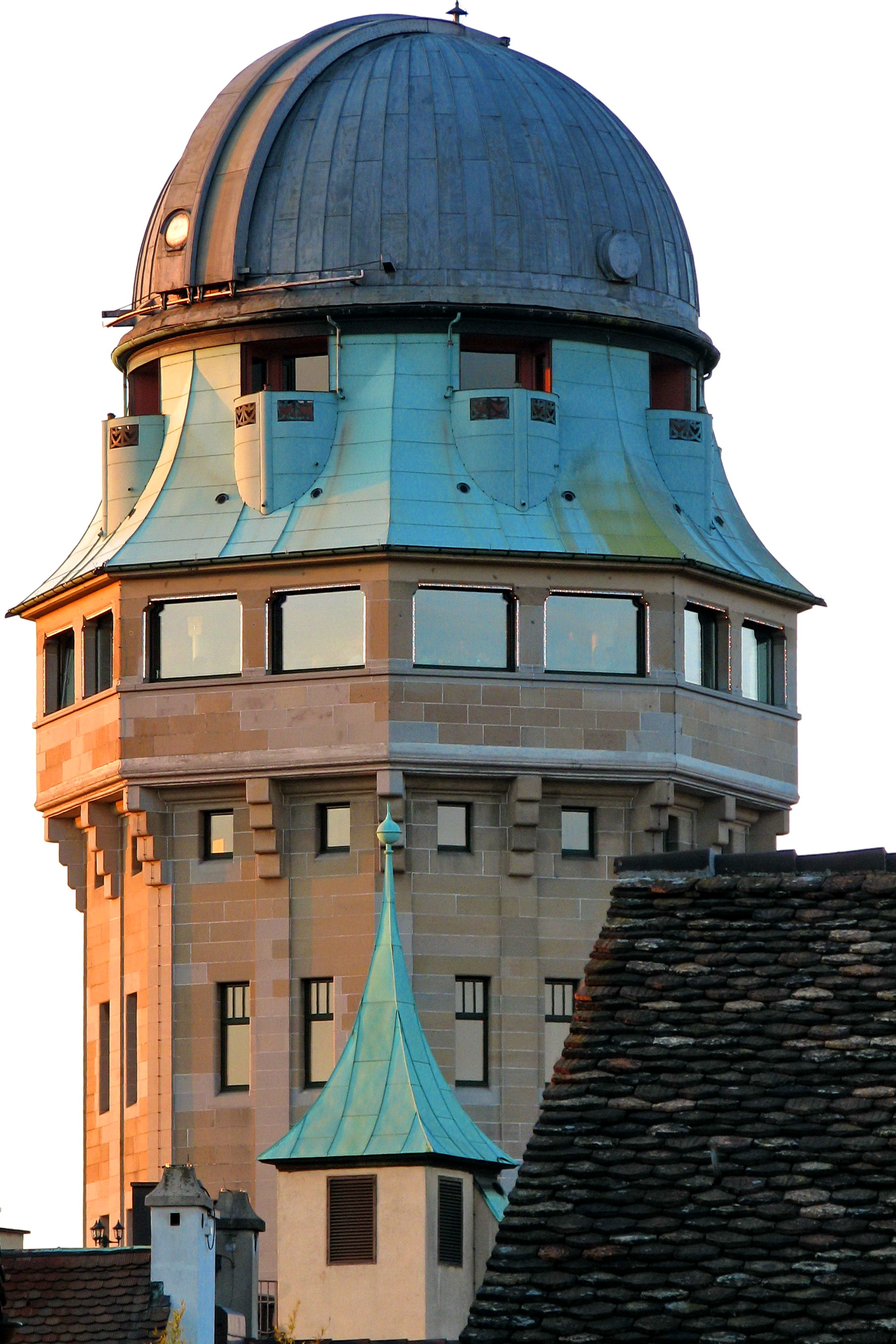
Telescope dome, seen from Lindenhof hill

Urania's refracting telescope is equipped with a Fraunhofer two-lens system of 30 cm aperture and focal length of 5.05 meters, allowing maximal 600-fold magnification (mostly used 150- to 205-fold magnification). The refractor in the dome area is the center of the imposing tower building: The telescope stands on a pillar, contact-free installed through the center of the building to the foundations of the business house Urania, fitted with anti-vibration installations.

Its optical telescope measures twelve tons and was designed by Carl Zeiss AG in Jena, Germany, considered as a technical masterpiece. Urania's refractor topped technological history as "Urania type". On its centenary anniversary, telescope and dome were fully renewed. The Zeiss telescope, still meeting today's demands, was dismantled in March 2006, and fully restored in Jena. On April 25, 2007, the telescope was hoisted into the observatory's 51 m high dome, on May 4, 2007, its second opening ceremony was celebrated.

== Observations and limitations ==
The observatory offers guided tours – Moon, Solar System objects, stars, star clusters, interstellar clouds, and galaxies – and special events for a wide audience, as well as individual tours for schools and groups. Paid public tours can be found on clear weather from Tuesday to Friday, starting at 20:00 (8 pm). The central location and the city of Zurich overriding observation tower also provide an unusual view of the city, Lake Zurich and Alps. The Urania house hosts a restaurant and an exclusive Bar, too. At the same time, its location in the middle of the city of Zurich is a serious problem: light pollution allows restricted observations of few galaxies and nebulae. Therefore, observations are limited practically to the moon and planets and bright celestial objects.

== Cultural heritage of national importance ==
The observatory is, as part of the building ensemble at that area, listed in the Swiss inventory of cultural property of national and regional significance as a Class A object of national importance.

== See also ==
- List of astronomical observatories
- List of astronomical societies
- Lists of telescopes
