= Altstadt (Zurich) =

Altstadt Kreis 1 District 1
- District
- Flag Seal

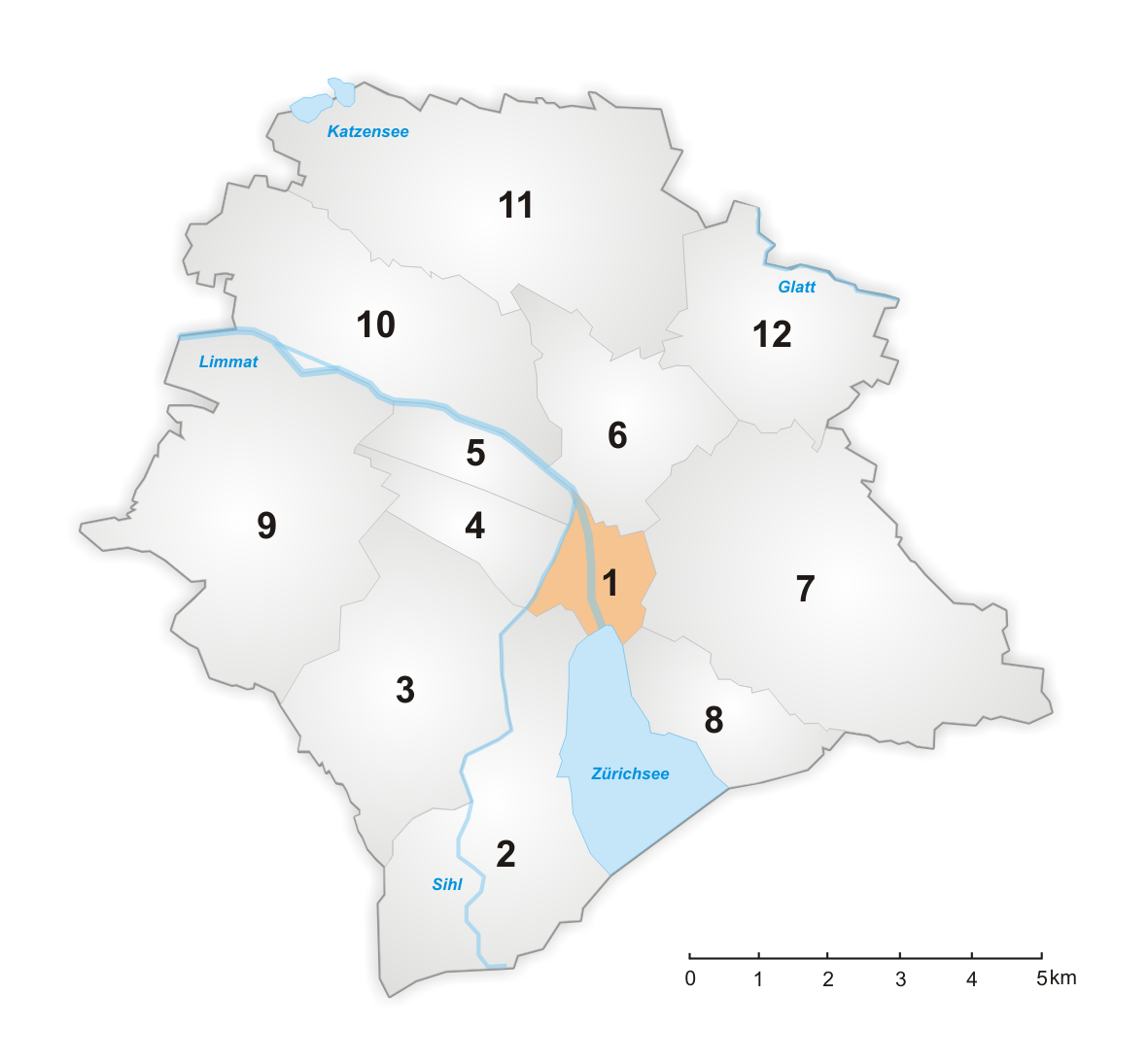
- Coordinates: 47.370°N 8.542°E
- Country: Switzerland
- Canton: Zurich
- City: Zurich

Area
  - Total: 1.8 km^{2} (0.69 sq mi)

Population (31. Dec. 2015)
  - Total: 5,617
  - Density: 3,120/km^{2} (8,100/sq mi)
- District Number: 1
- Quarters: Rathaus; Hochschulen; Lindenhof; City

The Altstadt (German pronunciation: [ˈaltˌʃtat], lit. 'old town') in the Swiss city of Zurich encompasses the area of the entire historical city before 1893, before the incorporation of what are now districts 2 to 12 into the municipality, over the period 1893 to 1934. Die Altstadt approximately corresponds to the area enclosed by the former city ramparts, and is today within the administrative area of the city called Kreis 1 (District 1).

With a population of 5,617 (as of 2015), it houses about 1.4% of the city's total population.

Administratively, District 1 is divided into four parts or quarters by the Zurich statistical office, Rathaus (town hall), Hochschulen (universities), Lindenhof ("lime trees courtyard") and City. Lindenhof and Rathaus correspond to the parts of the medieval city left (west) and right (east) of the Limmat, respectively, while City and Hochschulen include the area of the Early Modern city west and east of the medieval walls, respectively.

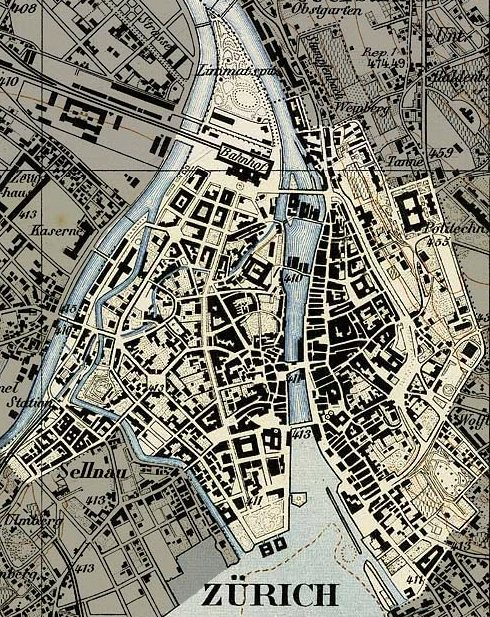
The city of Zürich on the 1881 Siegfriedkarte (city area highlighted), after the construction of the Limmatquai and the train station, but before the construction of Uraniastrasse, and of the lakeside quais with Quaibrücke (hover mouse over map for labels)

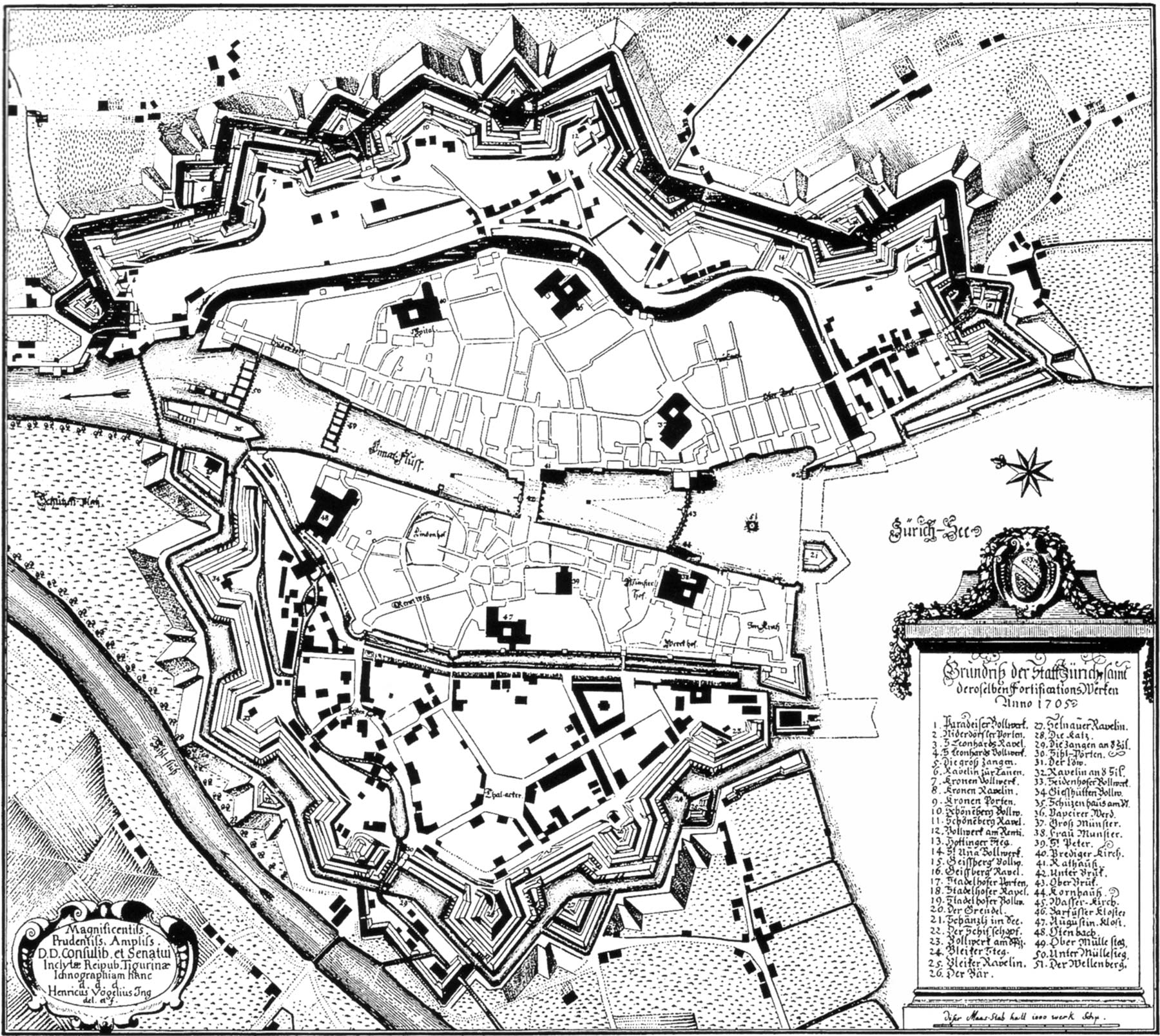
Map of Zurich in 1705 (north is left). Altstadt corresponds to the fortified area and immediately adjacent parts.

== Lindenhof ==
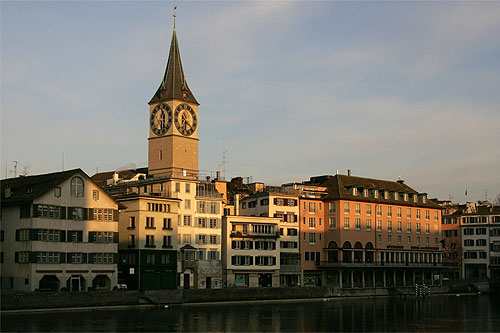
Altstadt: St. Peter church

Der Lindenhof ("The lime trees courtyard") quarter corresponds to the mindere Stadt, the smaller but more prestigious half of the medieval town left of the river. This is the oldest core of the city, with settlement traces dating to pre-Roman (La Tène) times, and fortified as the Roman Vicus Turicum, a Roman customs station with a surrounding civilian settlement, in the final decades of the 1st century BC.

The Lindenhof hill itself is the site of the Roman castle at the location of the Celtic Oppidum Zurich-Lindenhof, rebuilt in Carolingian times but derelict by the 13th century, when it was used as a source for building stone for the first stone houses of rich burghers of the recently reichsfrei city. The Schipfe quarter at the Limmat below the Lindenhof is the site of the Roman vicus, with traces of a hypocaustum nearby the Münsterhof excavated. St. Peter church was the parish church of the medieval city, built on the site of an earlier temple to Jupiter.

The Rennweg street below the Lindenhof hill was the main street of the medieval city, entering by the Rennweg gate through the western city wall which is now marked by the course of Bahnhofstrasse. Augustinergasse is a small street leading from St. Peterhofstatt situated at the St. Peter church, passing the former Augustinians monastery below the Lindenhof hill, towards the Kecinstürlin gate at the southern Fröschengraben moat, Bahnhofstrasse as of today.

Zunfthaus zur Meisen at Münsterhof plaza near Fraumünster church houses the porcelain and faience collection of the Swiss National Museum. Lindenhof also contains the former Augustinian abbey, and formerly the Oetenbach nunnery north of the Lindenhof hill, demolished in 1903 to make way for the Uraniastrasse as part the partially built «Urania-axis» Sihlporte–Uraniastrasse–Zähringerplatz by Gustav Gull, and the Urania Sternwarte.

=== Fraumünster ===
The Fraumünster ("women's minster") abbey ruled the town until the 1336 "guild revolution" of Rudolf Brun and which remained highly influential until Zwingli's Reformation.

== Rathaus ==
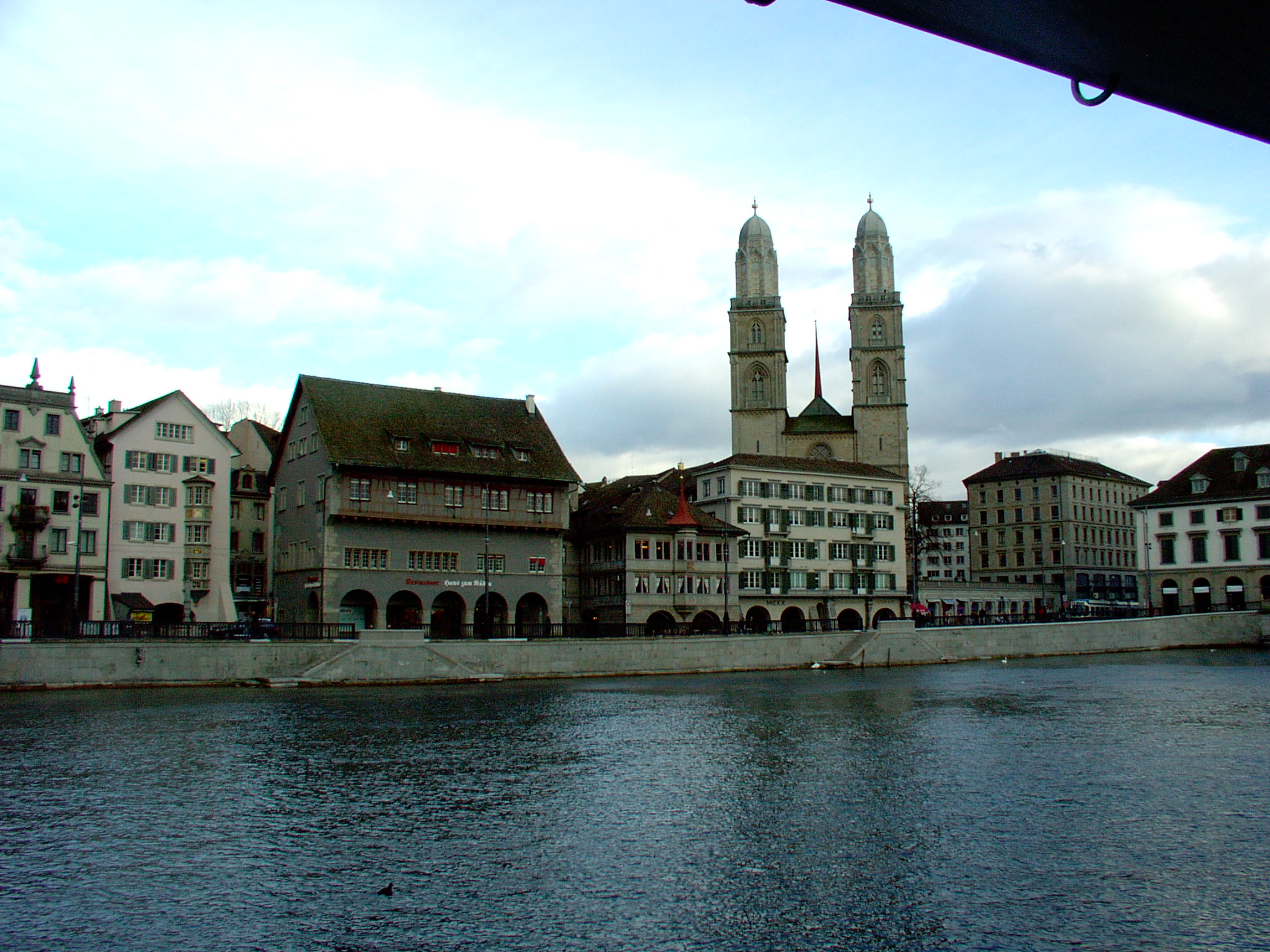
Limmatquai with guild houses and Grossmünster

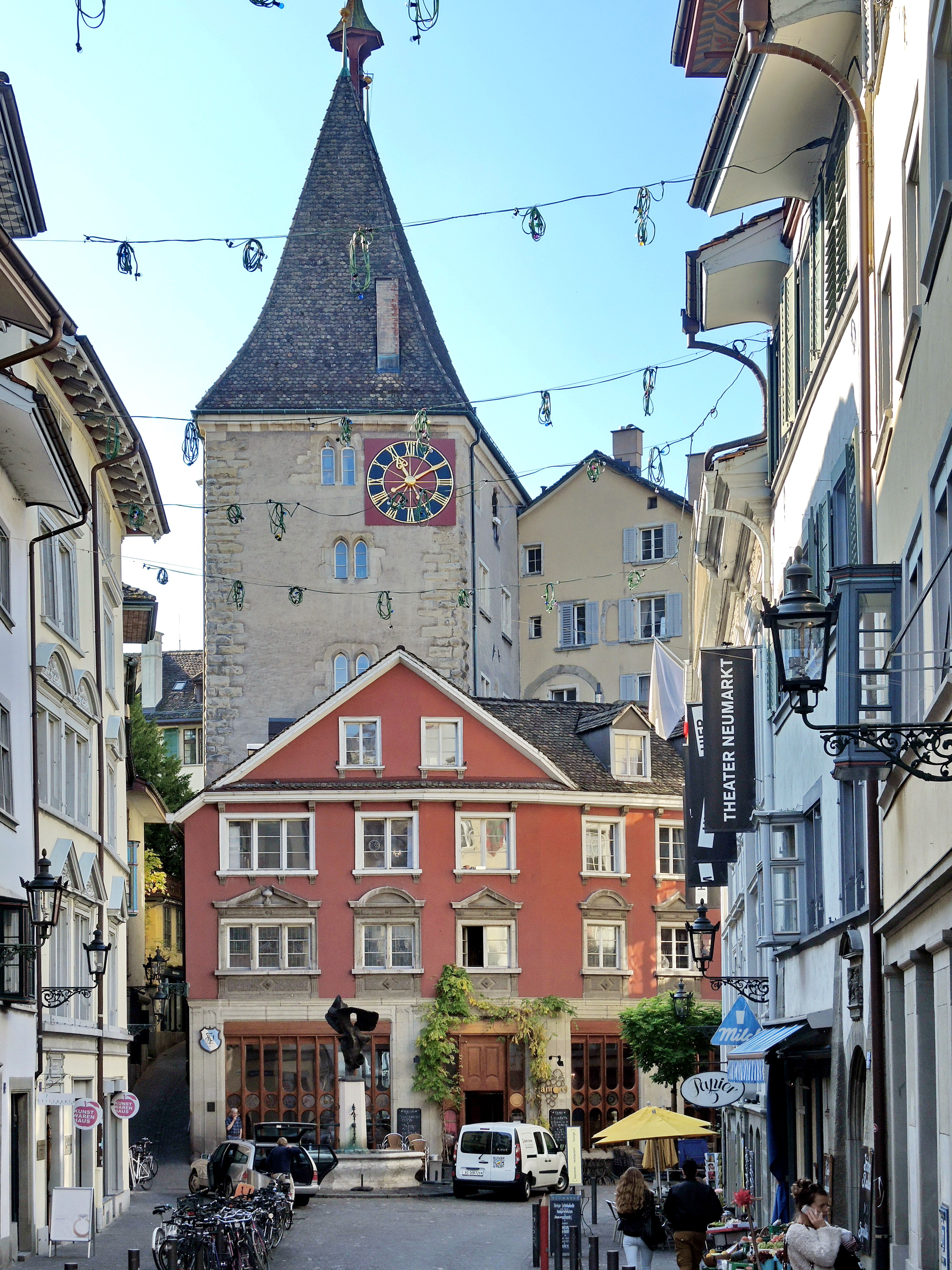
Neumarkt and Grimmenturm

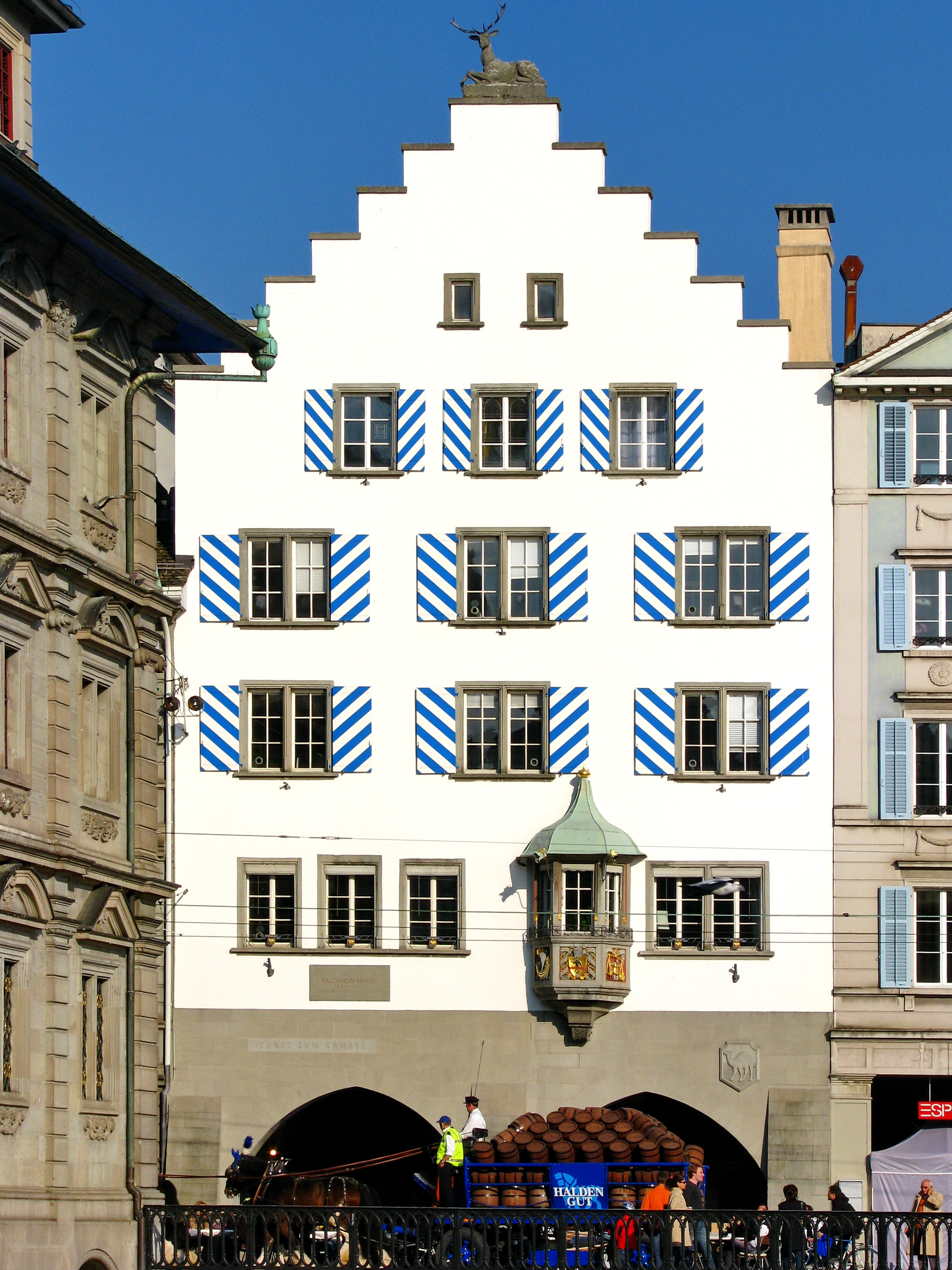
Guild house «Haue» at Limmatquai, Rathaus at the left side (2008)

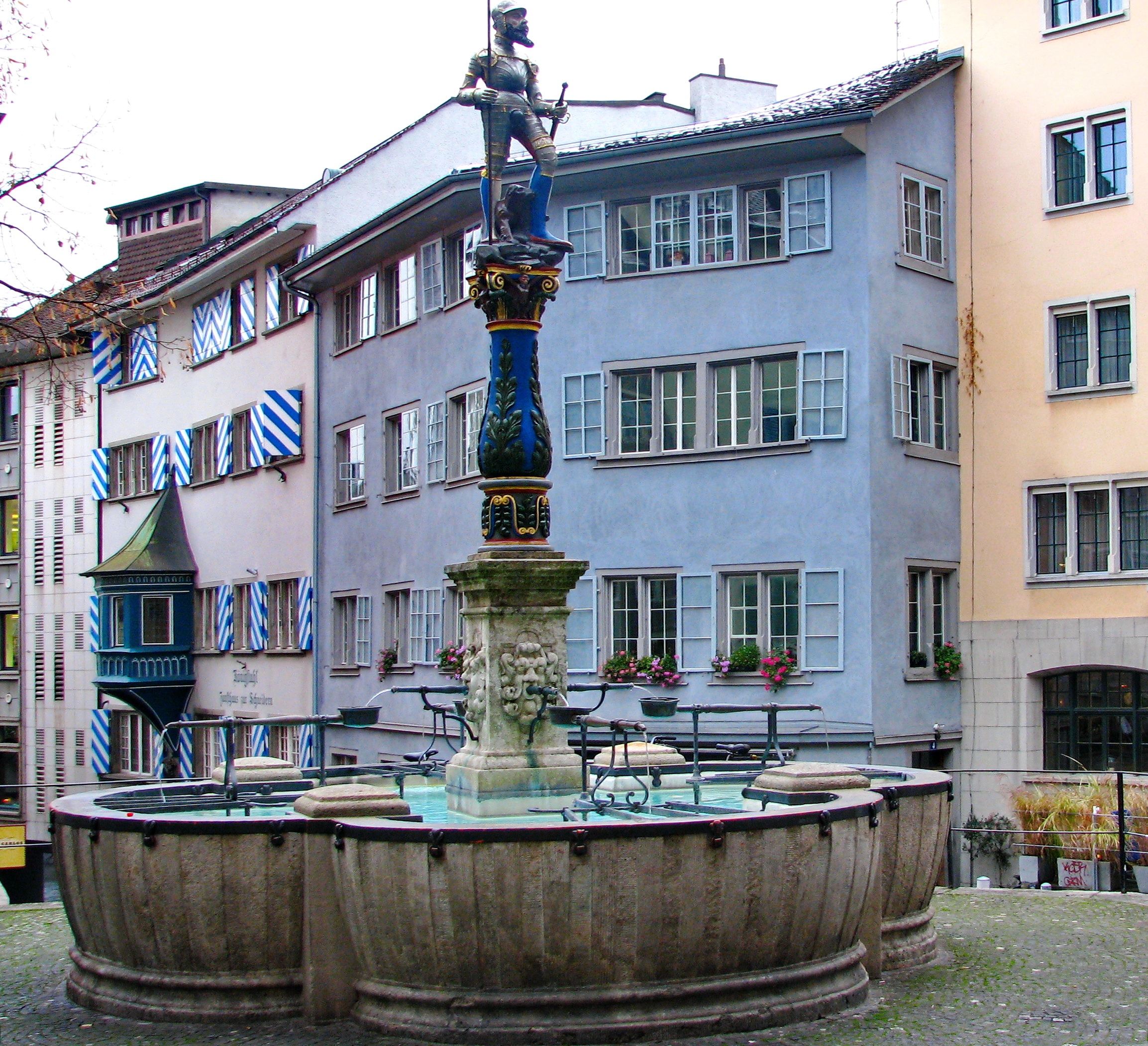
Niederdorf: Stüssihofstatt, guild house «zur Schneidern» (tailors) at the left side, and Restaurant Johanniter (right side)

The Rathaus quarter is named for the town hall, built in the 1690s. It is the part of the medieval town on the right side of the Limmat, separated by the Hirschengraben from the Hochschulen quarter to the east, and delimited by the Bellevue and Central squares to the south and north, respectively. As such, it includes the Limmatquai as well as the Niederdorf (downstream of the Kirchgasse) and the Oberdorf (upstream of the Kirchgasse). The historical name of this eastern half of the medieval town was "greater town" (mehrere Stadt), contrasting with the "lesser town" (mindere Stadt), the western half along the left river bank.

=== Limmatquai ===
The Limmatquai was built along the right side of the Limmat, running from Central to Bellevue. It was built in the 19th century, connecting various earlier quais built into the Limmat. The current right bank is some 28 m west of the medieval river's. The quai was constructed from 1823–1859 from Bellevue to the Rathaus, in 1835–1836 from the Rathaus to the Wasserkirche and 1835–1839 the portion from the Wasserkirche to Bellevue, formerly called Sonnenquai. At the Limmatquai are located some guild houses, as Zunfthaus zur Zimmerleuten, Zunfthaus zur Haue, Zunfthaus zum Rüden and Zunfthaus zur Saffran. Zurich tram routes 4 and 15 run along the Limmatquai, serving the stops Helmhaus, Rathaus and Rudolf-Brun-Brücke. The quai was one of the main routes through the old town before it was freed from traffic in 2004. The bridges passed by the Limmatquai, south to north, are:

- Quaibrücke, connecting Bellevue and Bürkliplatz,
- Münsterbrücke between Grossmünster and Fraumünster,
- Rathausbrücke just north of the town hall,
- Rudolf-Brun-Brücke, between Mühlegasse and Uraniastrasse,
- the Mühlesteg footbridge
- Bahnhofbrücke, between Central and Zürich Hauptbahnhof.

north of Limmatquai:

- Walche-Brücke
- the Drahtschmidlisteg, a footbridge to Platzspitz

=== Niederdorf ===
The Niederdorf (lit.: "low village") was the least developed part of the medieval city. It properly includes just the north-eastern corner, between Mühlegasse and Central, but the term was extended to the whole part of the mehrere Stadt north of the town hall, i.e. for the entire length of the Niederdorfstrasse, or even including the parts north of the Kirchgasse.

So defined, the Niederdorf includes Rindermarkt and Neumarkt, Froschaugasse and the area of the medieval Jewish quarter, the Predigerkirche (the former Blackfriars' monastery) at Zähringerplatz (historically the city hospital, now housing the city library) and the Zähringerstrasse.

=== Münstergasse ===
The mehrere Stadt between the Niederdorf and the Oberdorf (between Rathaus and Kirchgasse) includes the Münstergasse, Obere Zäune, Untere Zäune and the Barfüsserkloster (the former Franciscan abbey) as well as a number of alleys leaving Münstergasse: Marktgasse, Spiegelgasse, Krebsgasse, Ankengasse, Römergasse and Kirchgasse.

=== Predigerkirche ===
Initially the church of the Predigerkloster (Dominican monastery), it became after the Reformation in Switzerland the parish church of Niederdorf respectively Neumarkt, and owns since 1900 the tallest church tower of Zurich.

=== Oberdorf ===
The Oberdorf (lit.: "upper village") proper is the mehrere Stadt south of the Grossmünster, along the Oberdorfstrasse, between Kirchgasse and Rämistrasse.

== Hochschulen ==
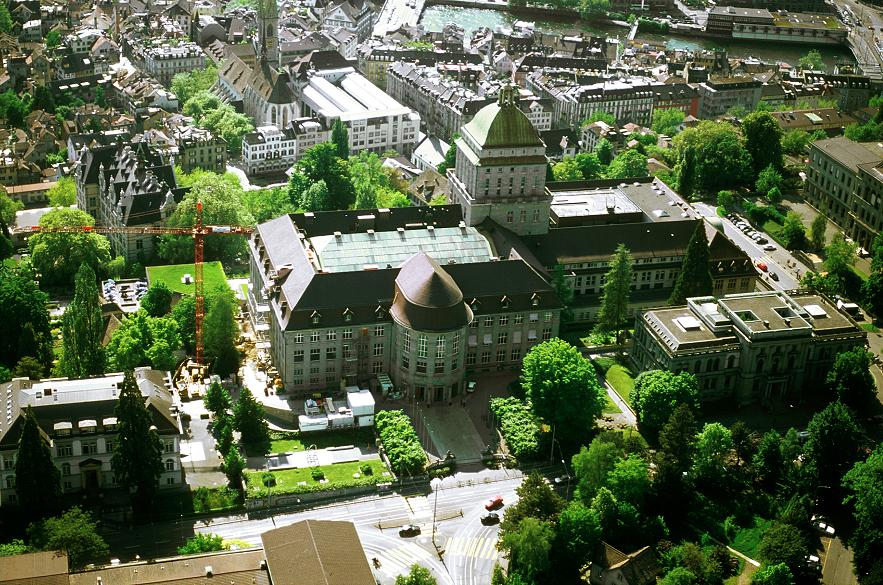
University main building, with the Predigerkirche, the Niederdorf and the Limmat in the background

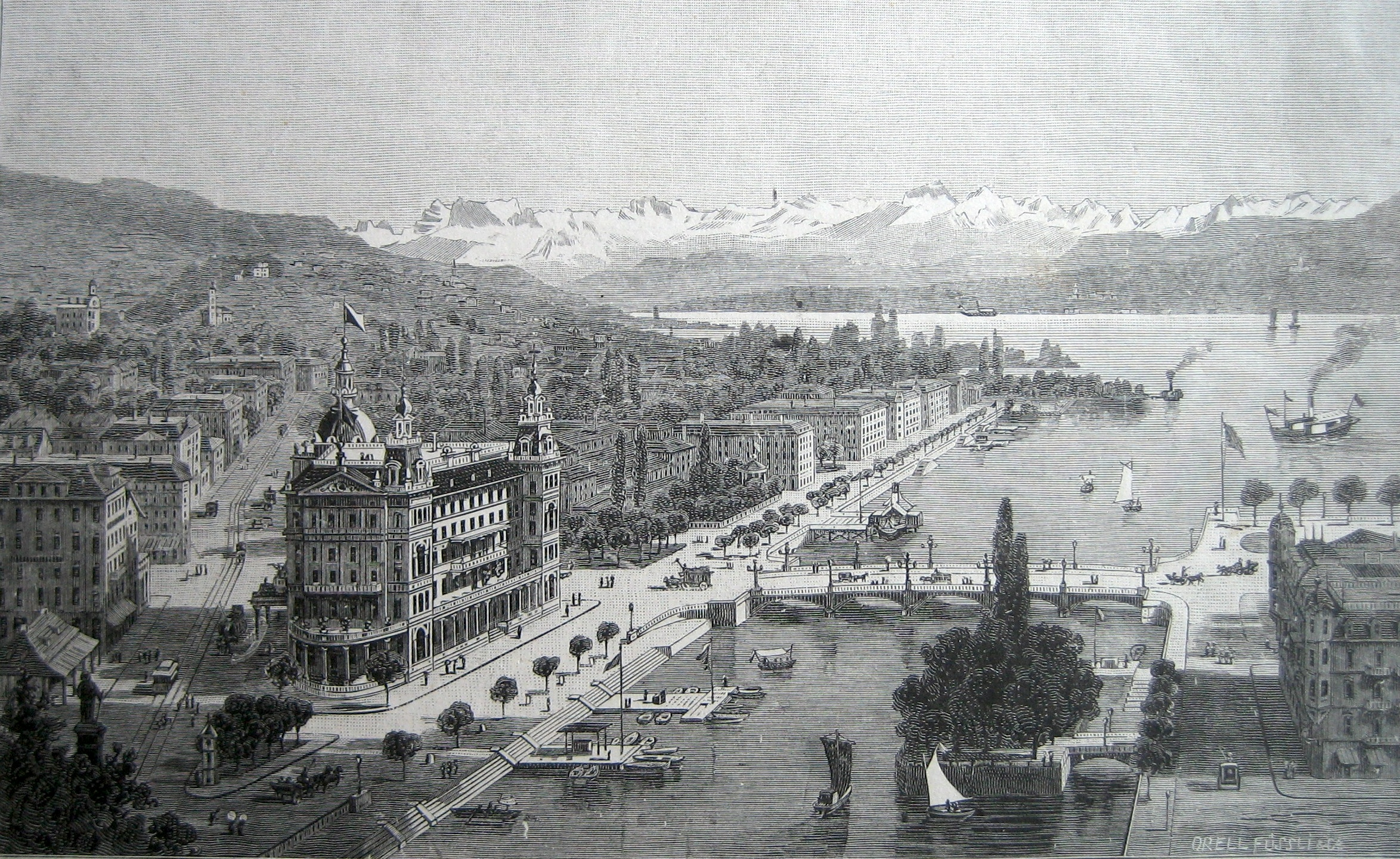
1890 etching of Grandhotel Bellevue at Bellevueplatz and the lakeside: Limmatquai downstream the Limmat, Quaibrücke crossing to Bürkliplatz, and Utoquai alongside Sechseläutenplatz.

Aerial view (1961)

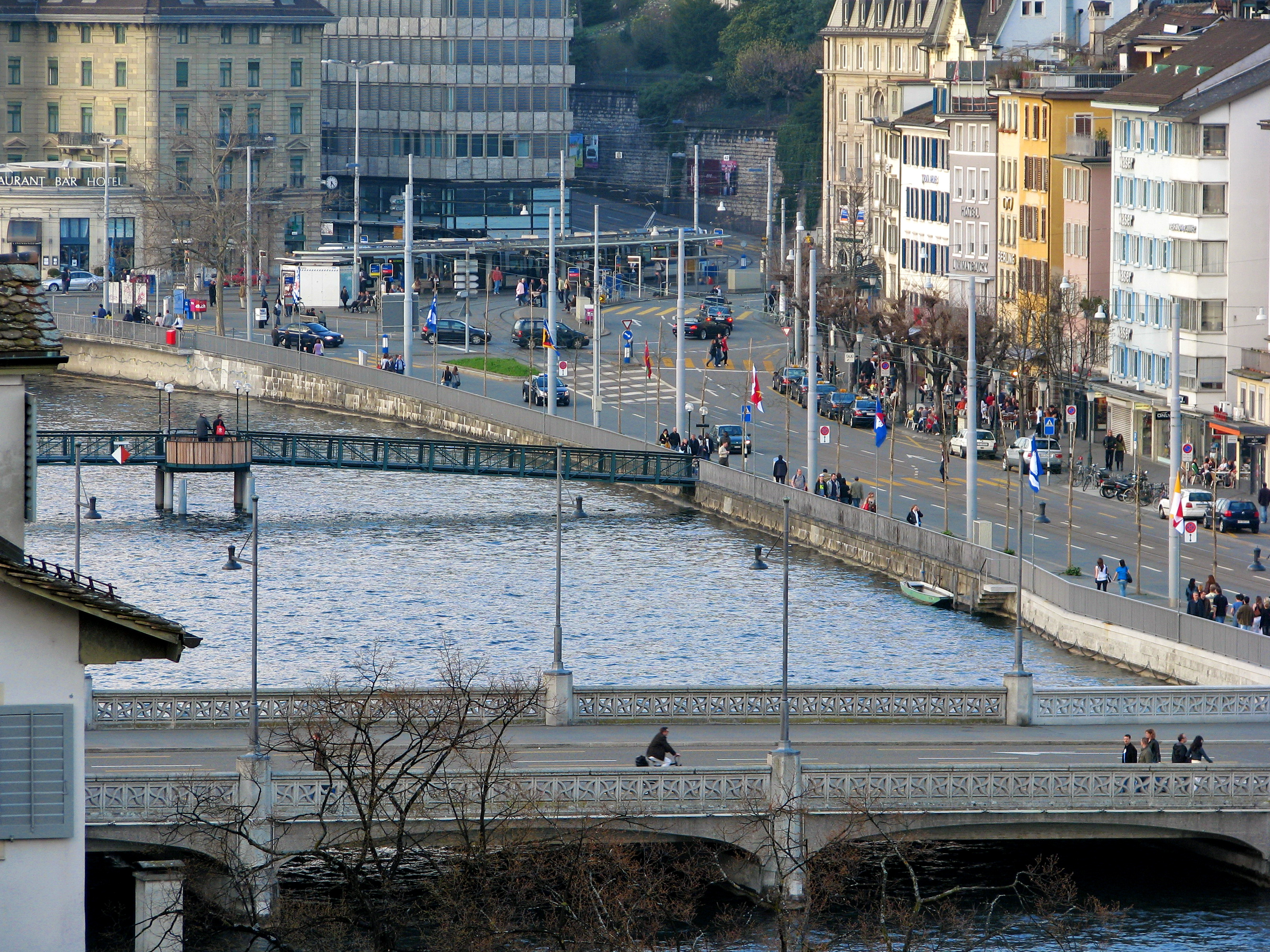
Central square, seen from Lindenhof hill, Limmatquai to the right

Hochschulen (universities) is wedged between Hirschengraben (the historical course of the eastern moat) and Rämistrasse, corresponding to the area taken up by the eastern fortifications of the 17th century ramparts (destroyed following the 1839 Züriputsch), the hillside now holding the main buildings of both ETH Zurich (built 1861 to 1864 under Gustav Zeuner) and University of Zurich (built 1914 under Karl Moser), at the sites of the Kronen Bollwerk and Schönenberg Bollwerk ramparts, respectively. Hochschulen borders on District 6 (Unterstrass and Oberstrass) to the north, on District 7 (Fluntern and Hottingen) to the east and on District 8 (Mühlebach and Seefeld) to the south.

Hochschulen in its southern end also includes the Bellevue and Sechseläuten squares as well as the theater and opera house at Stadelhoferplatz and the Stadelhofen train station. Stops of the Zurich tram system in the Hochschulen quarter are: Central, ETH/Universitätsspital, Kantonsschule, Kunsthaus, Neumarkt, Bellevue, Opernhaus and Stadelhofen. Line 9 follows Rämistrasse which separates Hochschulen from Fluntern, line 3 follows Hirschengraben and Seilergraben (the historical eastern moat), which separates it from the Rathaus quarter. The Polybahn funicular connects Central and the ETH Zurich main building.

=== Central ===
The Central square at the northern border between Rathaus and Hochschulen quarters is a major junction of the Zurich tram system, served by lines 3, 4, 6, 7, 10 and 15 besides buses 31 and 46. Formerly called Leonhardsplatz, it was renamed after the Hotel Central built in 1883.

=== Pfauen ===
Situated at Heimplatz, vernacularly called the Pfauen, are the theatre Schauspielhaus Zürich and the art museum Kunsthaus Zürich.

=== Bellevue ===
The Bellevueplatz, a square at the southern border between the Rathaus quarter and the southern end of the Hochschulen quarter, right next to the lake outflow, is a major junction of the Zurich tram system, served by lines 2, 4, 5, 8, 9, 11 and 15 besides buses 912 and 916. It is situated at the lakeside, just north of Sechseläutenplatz. It is named for the Grandhotel Bellevue built in 1856, and is the nodal point of the quaysides that were built between 1881 and 1887 crossing the Quaibrücke towards Bürkliplatz and General-Guisan-Quai.

=== Stadelhofen ===
South of Bellevue are the squares Sechseläutenplatz and Stadelhofenplatz. Stadelhofen was an estate just south of the southeasternmost bastion, the Stadelhofen Bollwerk, whilst Sechseläutenplatz takes its name from the Sechseläuten, a traditional Zurich festival that is celebrated there.

Stadelhofen station, on Stadelhoferplatz, is an important stop of the Zurich S-Bahn lines to Uster, Rapperswil-Jona and Winterthur as well as the terminal of the Forchbahn (S18) line serving Zumikon and Esslingen. The Zurich Opera House is situated at the southern end of the Sechseläutenplatz.

== City ==
City is the area west of the Bahnhofstrasse, delimited by the Sihl and the Schanzengraben, the moat of the 17th century ramparts. It includes the Paradeplatz, Zürich Hauptbahnhof, the Swiss National Museum and the Platzspitz park (formerly Limmatspitz). It comprises the tram stops Bürkliplatz, Paradeplatz, Rennweg, Bahnhofstrasse / Bahnhofplatz / Bahnhofquai, Löwenplatz, Sihlstrasse and Bahnhof Selnau. City borders on District 2 (Enge) to the southwest, and on Districts 4 and 5 (Aussersihl) to the northwest.

=== Platzspitz ===
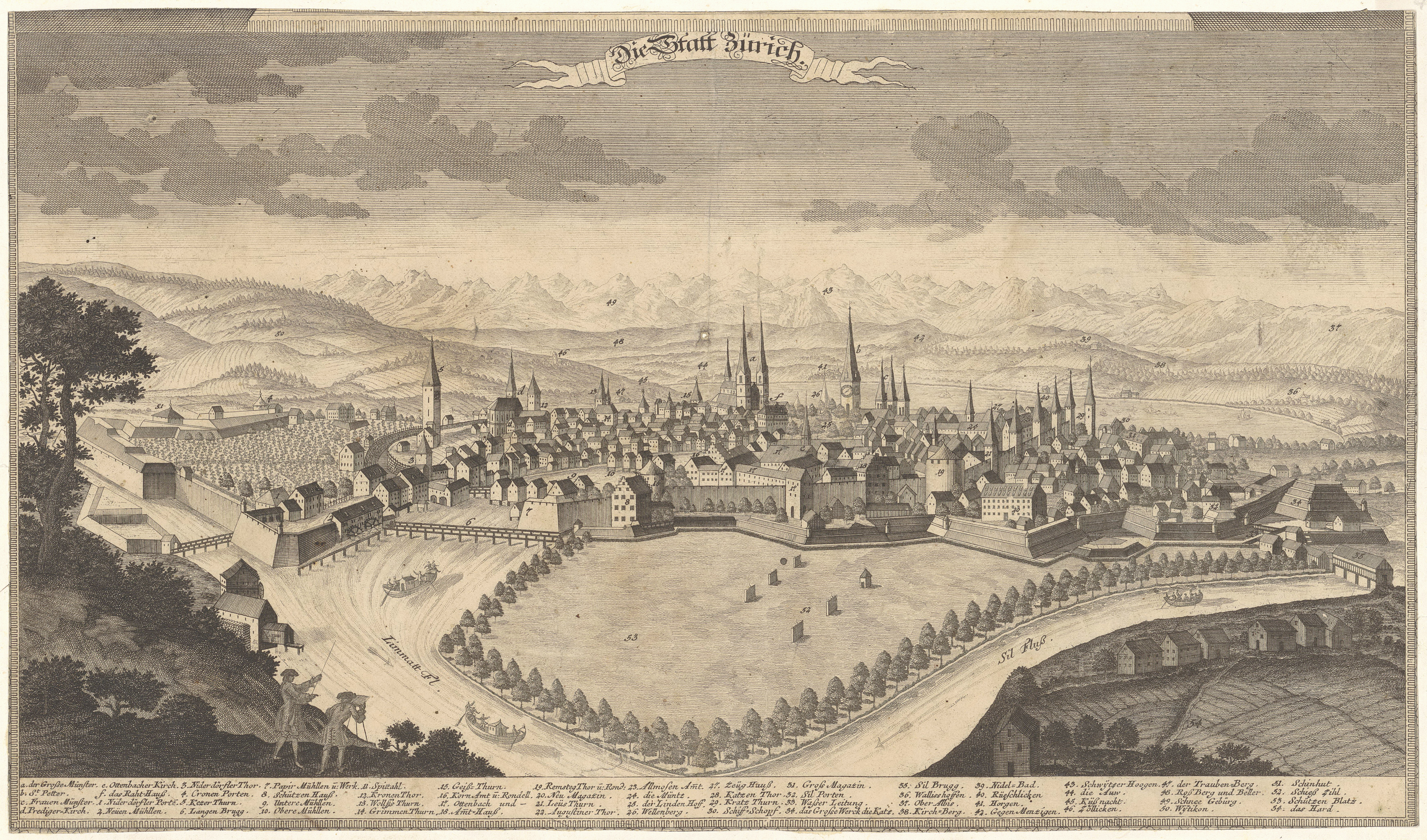
1724 view of the northern end of town, with the Platzspitz in the foreground, at the time a shooting-range

Platzspitz (formerly Platzpromenade, Limmatspitz) is a park at the confluence of the two rivers of Zurich; the Limmat and the Sihl.

In medieval times, the area situated north of the city was used as pasture. In the early 15th century it was made into a shooting-range, and in the 16th to 17th centuries, Schützenfeste were held there. A remnant of these can be found in the contemporary Knabenschiessen shooting contest.

During the 1990s, the long-practised official tolerance of drug users there from throughout Central Europe has been the subject of much worldwide media interest.

=== Hauptbahnhof ===
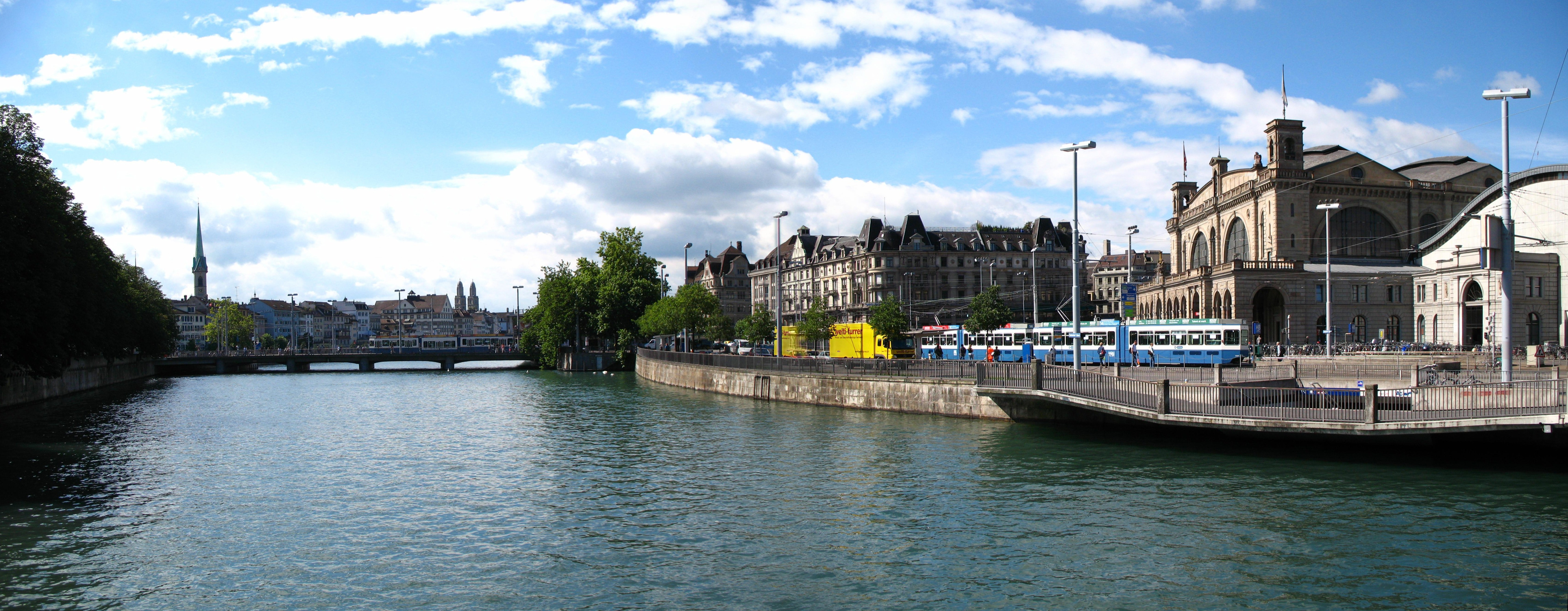
The Limmat, Bahnhofbrücke, Bahnhofquai and Hauptbahnhof seen from Walche-Brücke looking upstream

=== Bahnhofstrasse ===
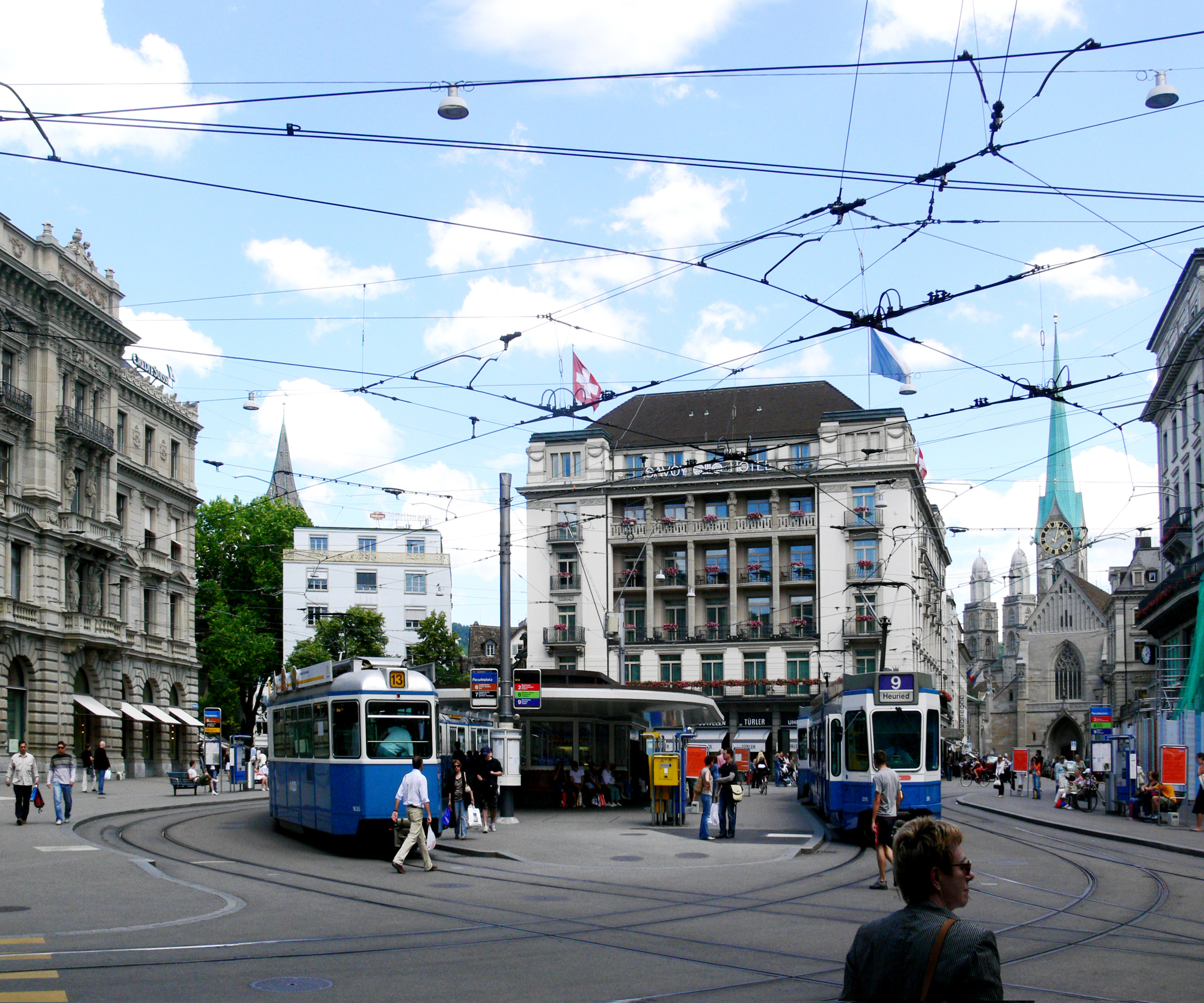
Paradeplatz

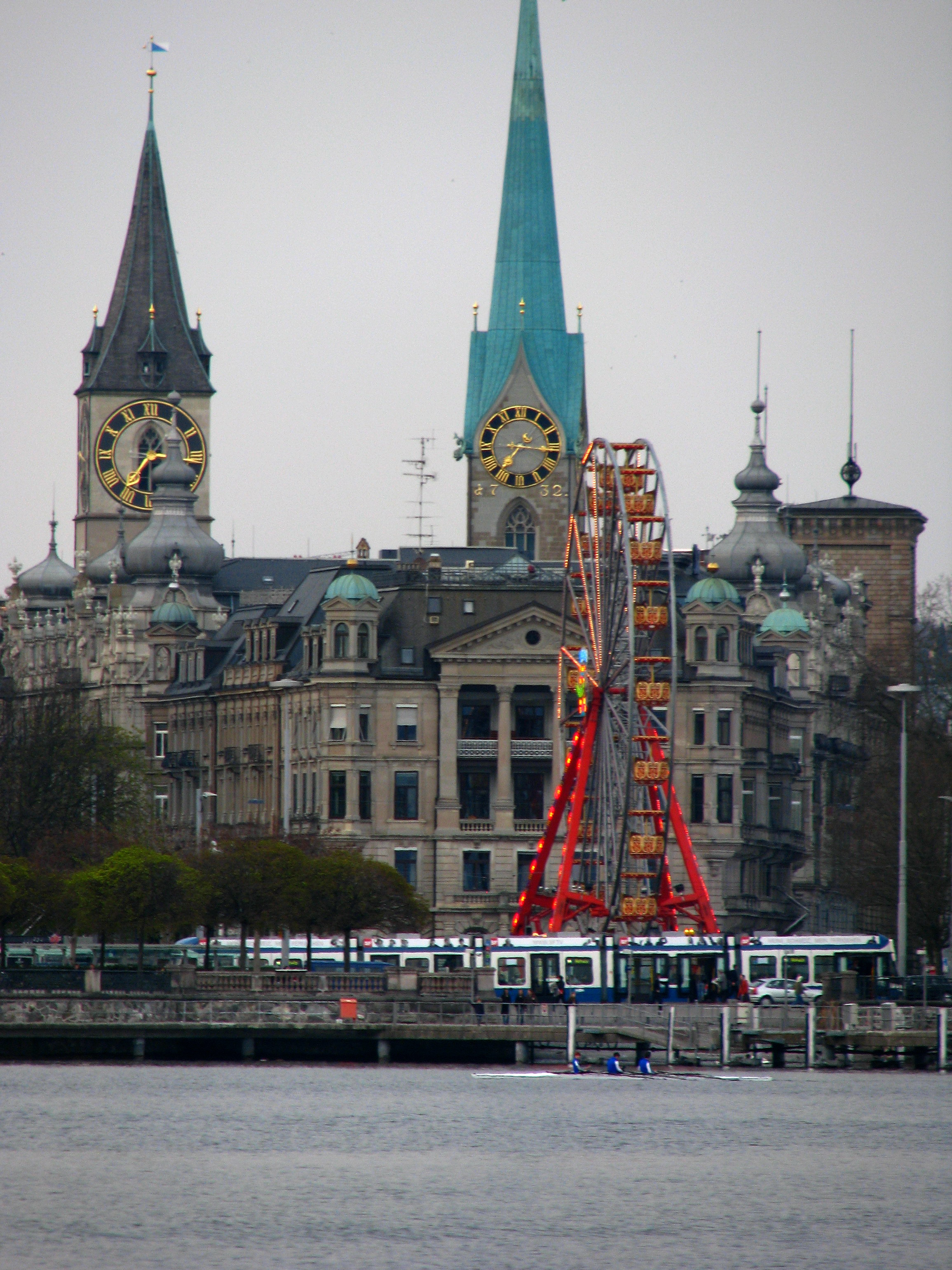
Bürkliplatz, St. Peter and Fraumünster church towers in the background

=== Bürkliplatz ===
Bürkliplatz is a square and stop of the Zurich tram system (lines 2, 4, 8, 9, 11 and buses 161, 165), situated at the southern end of the Bahnhofstrasse, and west of the Bellevue square, with which it is connected by the Quaibrücke. The lakeshore quay connecting the square with Lake Zurich is named General-Guisan-Quai, after Henri Guisan. From the Bürkliplatz landing gate, Zürichsee-Schifffahrtsgesellschaft boat services leave for Thalwil, Rapperswil, Schmerikon, Erlenbach and down the Limmat to Zürich Landesmuseum. Bürkliplatz is named for Arnold Bürkli (1833–1894), the engineer responsible for the construction of the city's quays.

=== Schanzengraben ===
On its remains at «zur Katz» ramparts, the Old Botanical Garden is located.

=== Selnau ===
Selnau (from earlier Sellnau, Seldnau) was historically an estate west of the city, which came to lie between the north-western moat (Schanzengraben) and the Sihl. Together with the Gessnerallee, Selnaustrasse and Sihlhölzlistrasse running along the right bank of the Sihl, it is part of the City quarter even though strictly situated outside the city ramparts. Today, Zürich Selnau railway station is a stop on the line of the Uetlibergbahn, running from Zürich Hauptbahnhof to the Sihltal (S4) and to the Uetliberg (S10). The SWX Swiss Exchange building is located in Selnau. The museum Haus Konstruktiv is located in a former power station near Selnau train station.

== See also ==
- History of Zurich
- Fortifications of Zurich

== Literature ==
- Heimatkunde der Stadt Zürich. Zürich: Büromaterialverwaltung, 1977.
- Hochbaudepartement der Stadt Zürich, Amt für Städtebau: Stadtzentrum – Altstadt / City. Verlag Neue Zürcher Zeitung, Zurich 2008 (Baukultur in Zürich, Band VI), ISBN 978-3-03823-343-5
