= Augustinerkloster Zürich =

Medieval monastery in Zurich, Switzerland

Coordinates: 47°22′18″N 8°32′21″E

Augustinerkloster was one of the eight monasteries within the medieval city of Zürich in Switzerland. It was founded around 1270 as an Augustinian Order priory on the site of the present Augustinerkirche Zürich on Münzplatz, and was abolished in 1524.

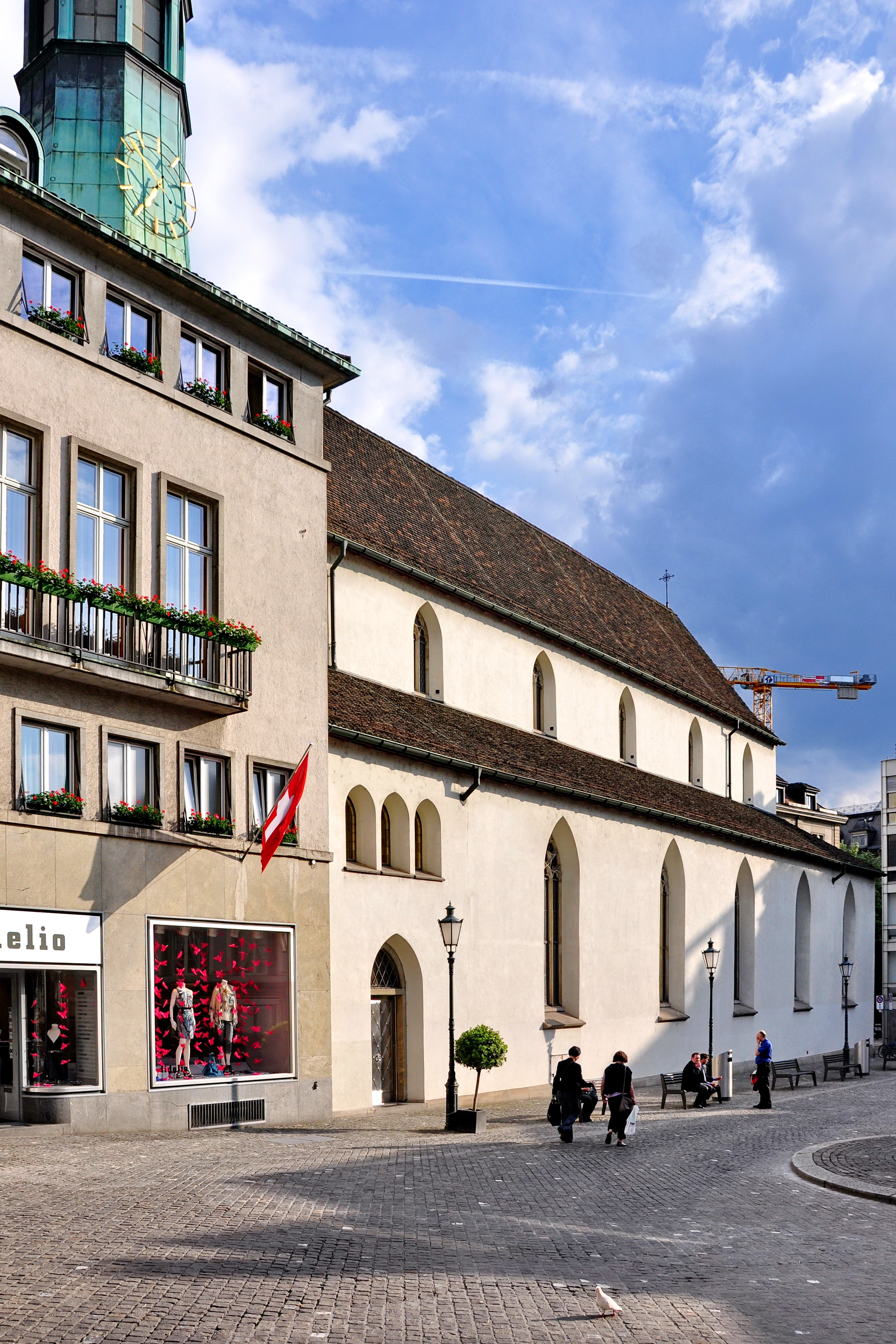
The northerly portal of the Augustiner church building at the Münzplatz square

== Geography ==
Situated on today's Münzplatz that is named after the later mint, the street Augustinergasse is named after the abbey. The area of the convent was west of the St. Peterhofstatt square towards the then Fröschengraben moat. The Augustinerkirche Zürich, like the street with the same name, is named after the former Augustinian monastery, meaning the church of the Augustinian order. In the high European Middle Ages, the abbey was part of the fortifications of Zürich, situated on the lower slope of the Lindenhof hill, at the location of the so-called small Kecinstürlin gate at the southern Fröschengraben moat, the Augustinertor gate. The inner moat was enforced by the 16th-century Schanzengraben.

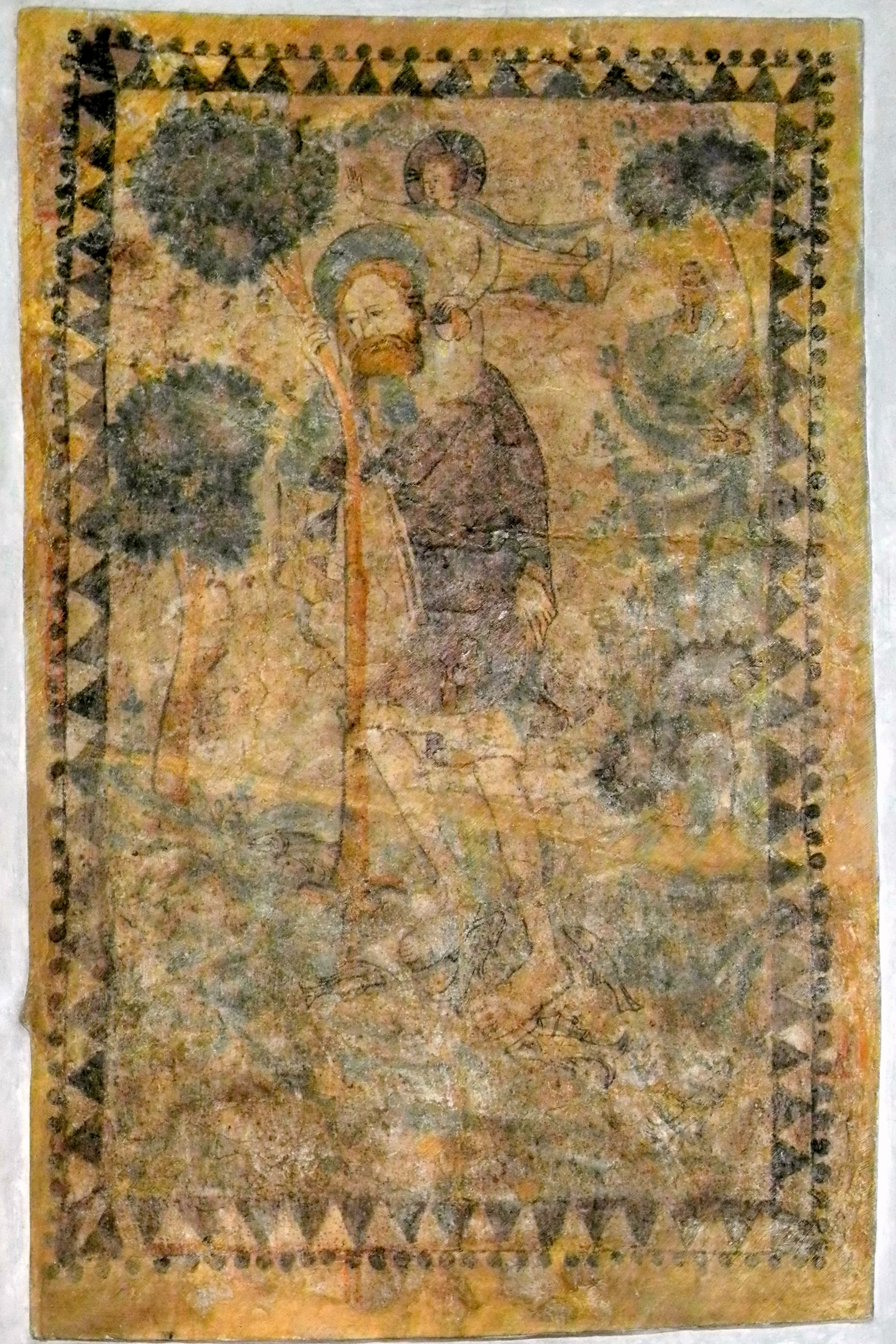
mural of Christophorus in the church

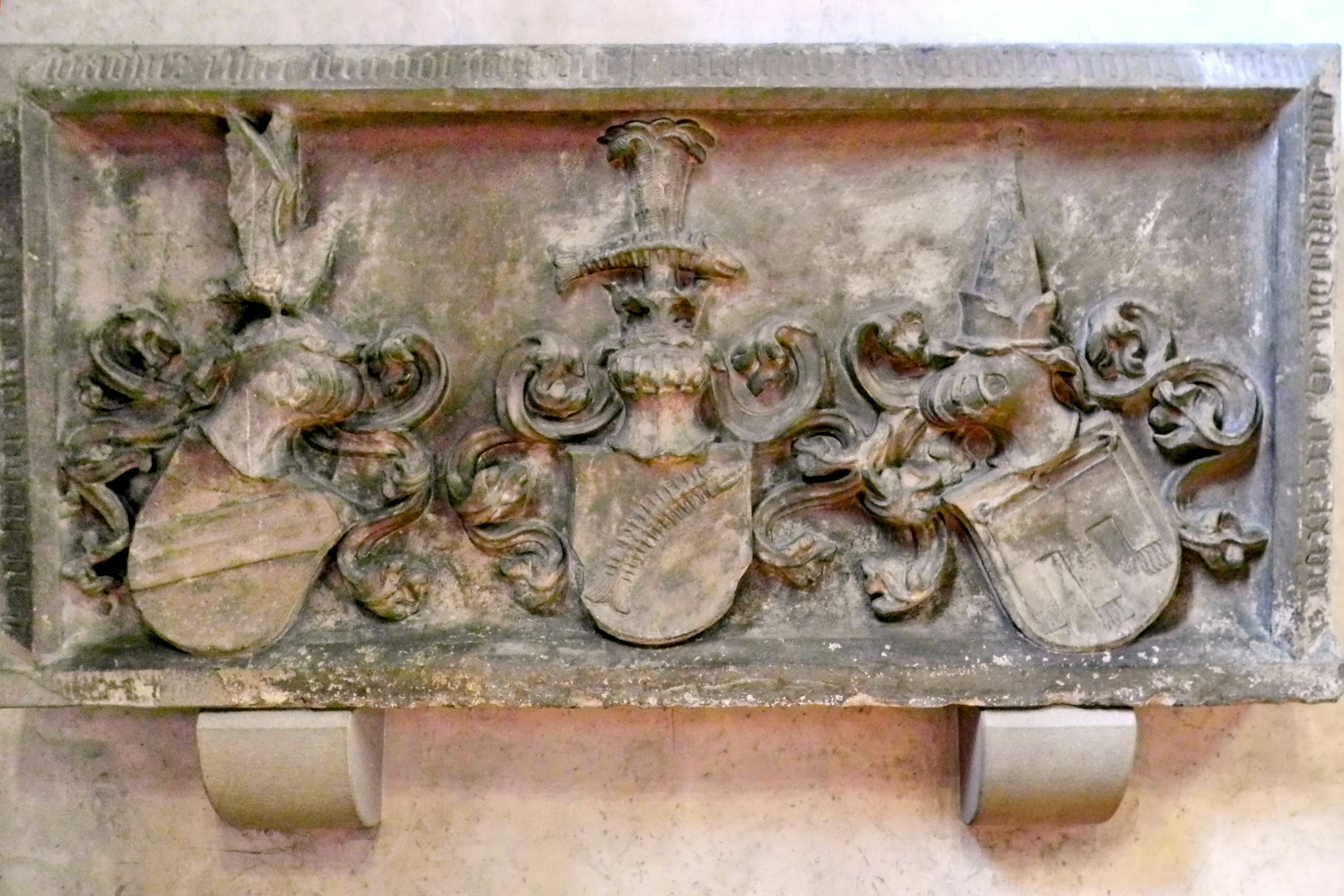
remains of the probably early 16th-century interior decoration

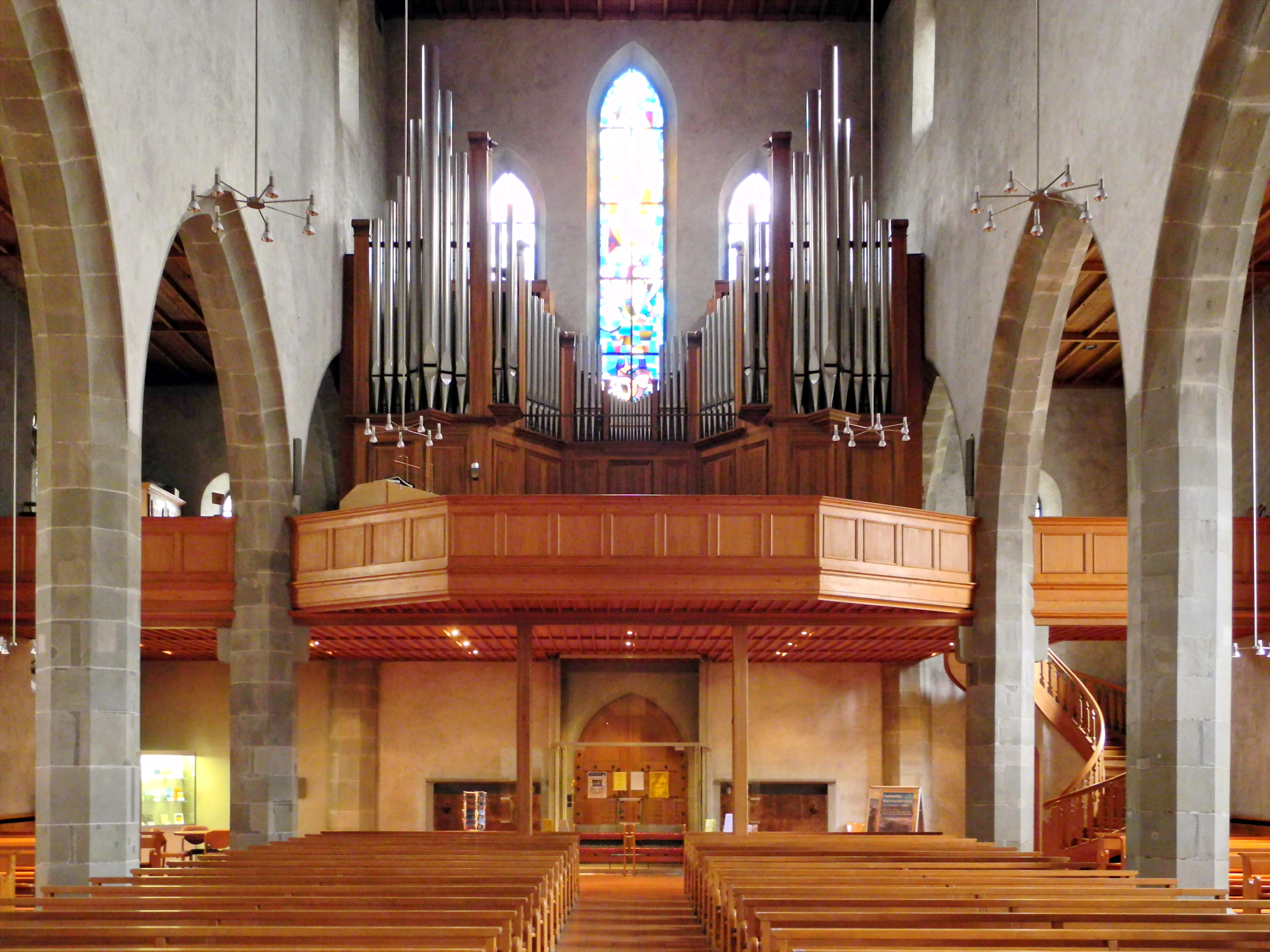
interior view towards the chorus and main portal

== History ==
The city of Zürich supported the popular mendicant orders of the times by attributing free plots in the suburbs, requiring them to assist with the construction of the city wall in return. In the west of the area, the city's fortification was not yet built in the late 11th or 12th century, and the Augustinian monks were allowed to settle there. The monastery consisted of the present Romanesque church, and a building complex attached to the north of the church. The important late medieval city fortifications, namely the Augustinertor and the Augustinerturm tower gates, are mentioned as its western section.

Until the 14th century memorial measurements in Zürich, as a basis for the increasing income, had to be held at Grossmünster. By 1524 all income obtained from funerals had also to be given to the Grossmünster abbey. Hence, like the other mendicant orders, the Augustinians were reduced to the status of area pastors within the medieval city. As a result, the order supported the Brun regime of the Guilds of Zürich and may therefore not have lost as much influence as its brother convents within the city walls, namely the Predigerkloster which even had to leave the city for one decade.

During the Reformation in Zürich, the convent was abolished in 1524, worship in the church was discontinued, and the buildings and income of the monastery were assigned to an Amt, conducting administration for the city government (Rat). In 1525 a wine press was installed, an alms institution established, and thereafter the administration was integrated in the so-called Rütiamt, the former Rüti Abbey.

In 1841 the Roman Catholic community of Zürich planned to build a church to commemorate the old Augustinian church. But, as the majority of the Catholic community rejected the decisions of the First Vatican Council of 1870, the whole community was expelled from the Catholic church, forming the present Christkatholische Kirche der Schweiz. This explains why Augustinerkirche is still its Parish church.

== Buildings ==
There was considerable construction activity, when the mendicant order, near the present "Strohof" (Augustinergasse 3) from Werner Strouhmeier acquired the estates of that name in 1270. The order had to build the section of the town wall, south of the Lindenhof hill and St. Peterhofstatt towards the Fröschengraben moat. The monastery complex consisted of a rectangular four bay wing, housing the later Rütiamt, where the Augustinerturm gate was erected. On both sides of the lower edge of the roof of the tower, there were the two wings of the so-called Almosen office of 1524. The transverse wing was used as the refectory, the monks' dining hall. The monastery area was separated by a wall from the urban environment. On the northwestern narrow side of the monastery, there is the present Augustinerkirche, the nave and chancel under one roof. The present roof skylights disappeared in 1692, and were rebuilt in 1936/37.

== Stained glass windows ==
In 1519 the Augustinian community petitioned the governments of the thirteen members of the Old Swiss Confederacy for chapter house windows. The canton of Fribourg approved and one of the windows showed the attached coat of arms, marking a community foundation of Basel, Fribourg, Solothurn, Schaffhausen and Appenzell. The art dealer Martin Usteri acquired 32 glass panes in 1796, which were sold from his legacy in 1829, and came into the Gröditzberg in Silesia. From there, six of the former stained glass windows were bought by the Gottfried Keller Foundation in 1894, exhibited in the cloister of the Fraumünster cathedral, and then entrusted to the Swiss National Museum on deposit.

== See also ==
- Augustinergasse
- Augustinerkirche Zürich

== Literature ==
- Dölf Wild: Stadtmauern. Ein neues Bild der Stadtbefestigungen Zürichs (= Stadtgeschichte und Städtebau in Zürich. Schriften zu Archäologie, Denkmalpflege und Stadtplanung. 5). Schrift zur Ausstellung im Haus zum Haus zum Rech, Zürich, 6. Februar bis 30. April 2004. Amt für Städtebau, Baugeschichtliches Archiv, Zürich 2004, ISBN 3-905384-05-1.
- Regine Abegg and Christine Barraud Wiener: Die Kunstdenkmäler des Kantons Zürich. Stadt Zürich Volume II.I, published by Gesellschaft für Schweizerische Kunstgeschichte GSK, Bern 2002, ISBN.
- Christine Barraud Wiener and Regine Abegg: Die Augustinerkirche in Zürich. Schweizerische Kunstführer, Volume 661, published by Gesellschaft für Schweizerische Kunstgeschichte GSK, Bern 1999, ISBN 3-85782-661-4.
- Walter Baumann: Zürichs Kirchen, Klöster und Kapellen bis zur Reformation. Verlag Neue Zürcher Zeitung NZZ, Zürich 1994, ISBN 978-3-8582-3508-4.
