= Günther Stern =

Günther Stern may refer to:

- Günther Anders (Günther Stern, 1902–1992), German-Austrian philosopher
- Guy Stern (Günther Stern, 1922–2023), German-American military interrogator
