= Seminarienhaus =

Building in Zürich

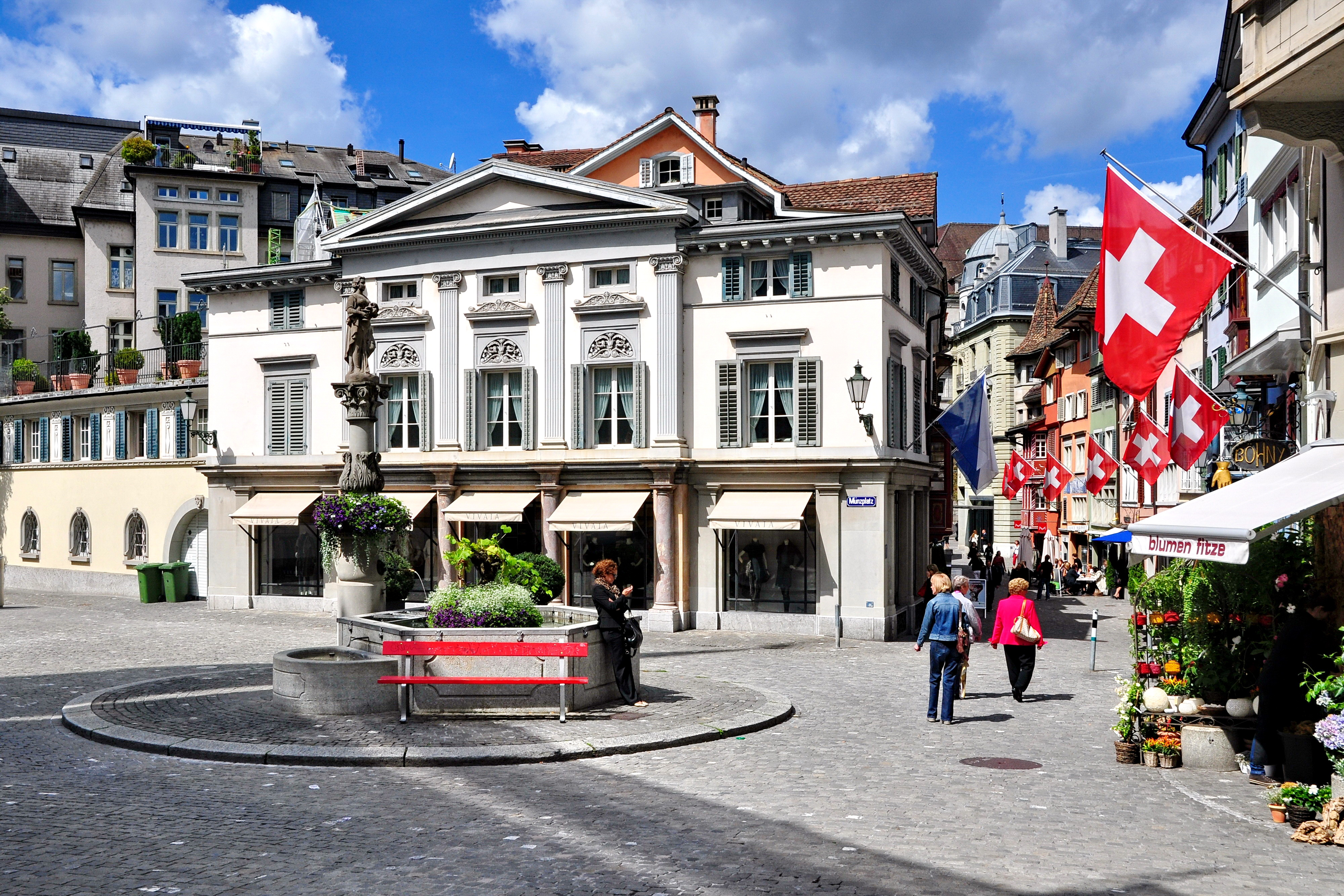
- The building in 2011, with the Folderbrunnen in front of it

General information
- Location: Zürich, Switzerland, Augustinergasse 15

Seminarienhaus is a historic building in Zürich, Switzerland.

Standing at Augustinergasse 15, on the western side of Münzplatz, in the shadow of the late-13th-century Augustinerkirche, the building is now a department store.

In the 20th century, it was a seminary house, run by Dr. Guy Stern, and the property of Ohio's Heidelberg University.

The building was also the long-term home of Arete, an antique gallery.
