= Christian Catholic Church of Switzerland =

Old Catholic denomination in Switzerland

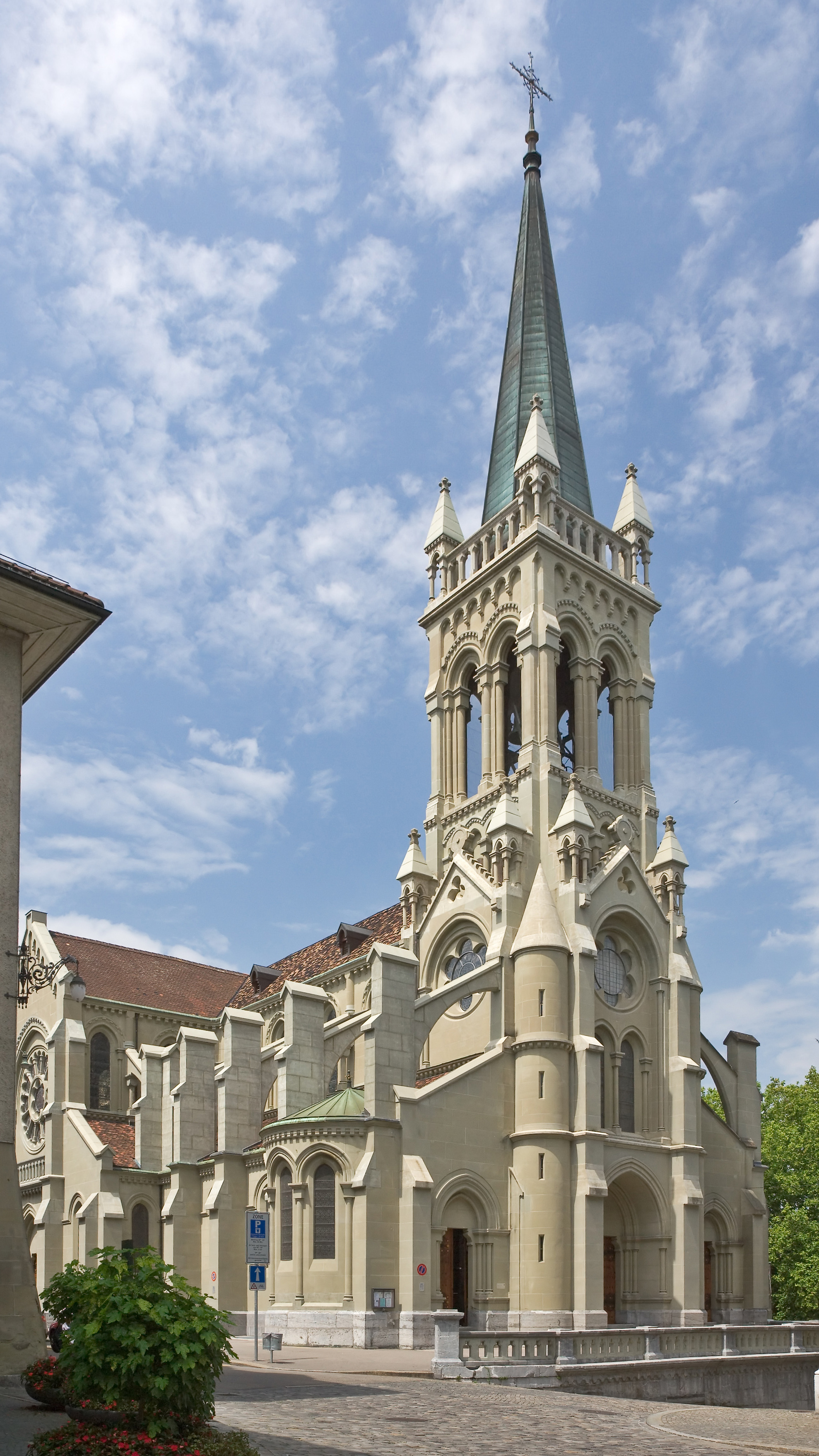
- Ss. Peter and Paul Cathedral in Bern
- Classification: Old Catholic
- Governance: Episcopal
- Leader: Bishop Harald Rein
- Associations: International Old Catholic Bishops' Conference
- Region: Switzerland
- Headquarters: Bern
- Separated from: Roman Catholic Church
- Congregations: 33
- Members: 9,184 As of 2018
- Ministers: 44
- Official website: www.christkatholisch.ch

The Christian Catholic Church of Switzerland is an Old Catholic denomination in Switzerland. This denomination is part of the Union of Utrecht.

== History ==
In 1871 the Zürich Catholic community planned to build a church to commemorate the 1270s Augustinian abbey church. As the whole community was excommunicated from the Catholic Church for refusing to accept the First Vatican Council, the Augustinerkirche at the Münzplatz became its present parish church. Ferdinand Stadler (1813–1870), an architect born in Zürich, was charged with the construction of a new church building.

In February 2000, Denise Wyss was ordained within the Christian Catholic Church of Switzerland, as the first female Old Catholic priest of Switzerland.

Between 1970 and 1990, the membership of the Christian Catholic Church decreased from 20,268 to only 11,748 members. Data from the last censuses show that the aging of the population is a much greater problem for the Christian Catholic Church than for the other national churches. However, contrary to the trend of church departures from the two large national churches, the Christian Catholic Church has again recorded a constant increase in membership since 1990. Between 1990 and 2000, the number of members grew by over 13% from 11,748 to 13,312.

In 2009, Bishop Harald Rein was elected as the head of the church. Prior to this, he served as a parish priest and as vicar general of the church. On September 12, 2009, he was consecrated in Zurich by Archbishop Joris Vercammen of Utrecht.

In June 2022, the church approved the introduction of the sacrament of same-sex marriage starting in July 2022, joining the churches of Germany and the Netherlands.

== Ecumenism ==
In ecumenism, the Christian Catholic Church of Switzerland is a member at the national level of the Association of Christian Churches in Switzerland, and at the international level of the Conference of European Churches and the World Council of Churches. At the national level, the Dialogue Commission of the Christian Catholic and Roman Catholic Churches in Switzerland (CRGK) has existed since 1966.

At the international level, within the framework of the ecumenical dialogues of the Union of Utrecht, the Christian Catholic Church was represented in the Eastern Orthodox-Old Catholic Dialogue at all meetings from 1975 to 1987; in the International Roman Catholic-Old Catholic Dialogue Commission (IRAD), the Christian Catholic bishop exercised the function of co-president from 2004 to 2009.

Christian Catholic theologians are also significantly involved in the current (international) dialogue commissions of the Union of Utrecht for Dialogue with Rome, with the Ecumenical Patriarchate, the Church of Sweden, and the Mar Thoma Church of India.

== Church buildings ==
The episcopal see of the denomination has been the Church of St. Peter and Paul, in Bern, since 1875. Another significant church is the Augustinerkirche Zürich.

== See also ==
- Augustin Keller
- Sonderbund
