= Augustinerkirche Zürich =

Church in Switzerland

Augustinerkirche
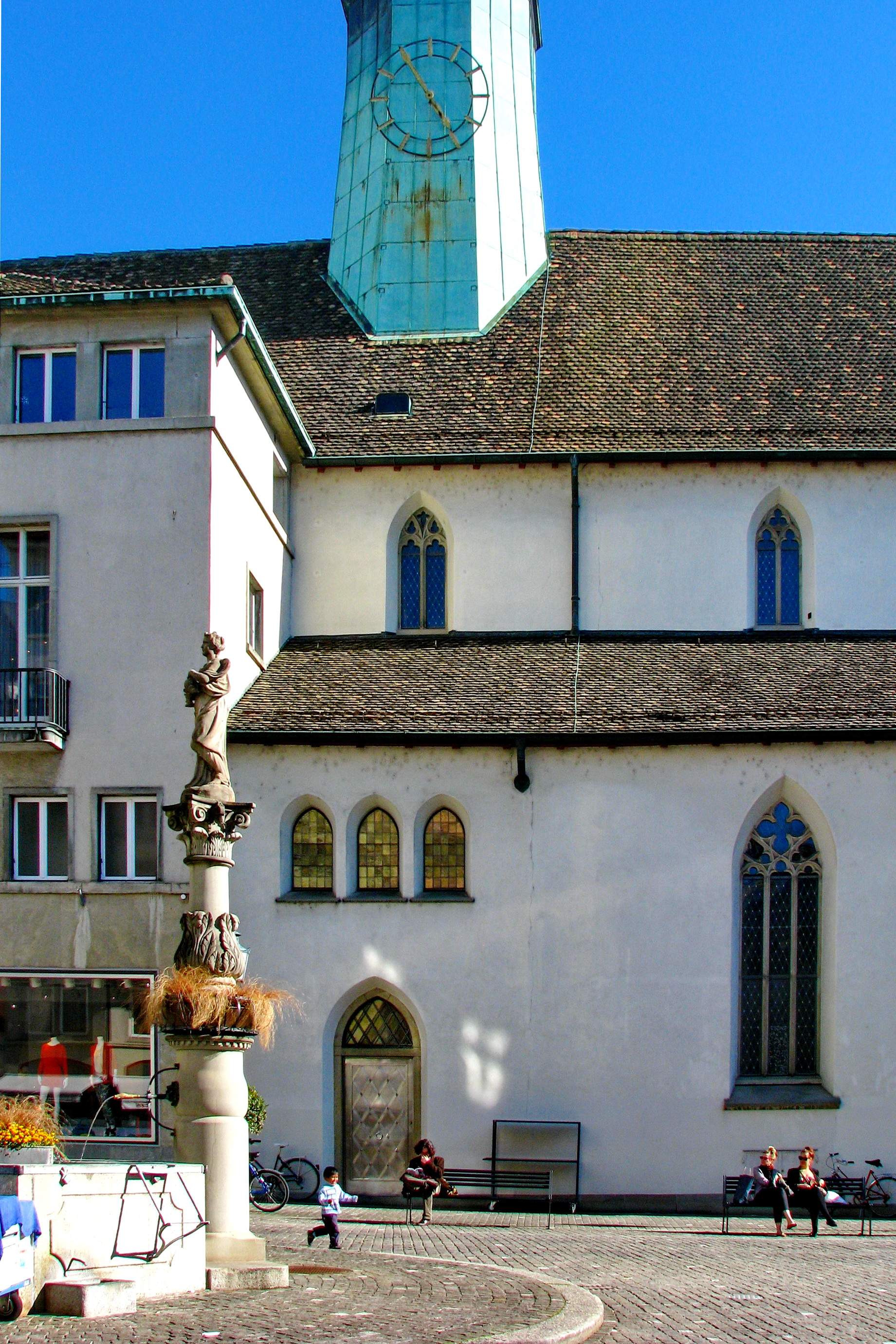
- Augustinerkirche at Münzplatz in Zürich as seen from Augustinergasse

Religion
- Affiliation: Christian Catholic Church of Switzerland

Location
- Location: Augustinergasse–Münzplatz, Zürich; Switzerland
- Interactive map of Augustinerkirche
- Coordinates: 47°22′18″N 8°32′21″E

Architecture
- Architect: Ferdinand Stadler
- Type: Church
- Style: Romanesque architecture
- Completed: around 1270 (Romanesque church); 1844 (Gothic revival church); 1959 (original construction re-established)

Website
- Official website (in German)

Augustinerkirche was once one of the five main churches in the old town of Zürich, Switzerland, together with Fraumünster, Grossmünster, Predigern and St. Peter's. First built around 1270 as a Romanesque church belonging to the Augustinian abbey, on occasion of the Reformation in Zürich worship in the church was discontinued. The present Christian Catholic Church community of Zürich planned to rebuild the building to commemorate the old Augustinian church, and for the same reason, Augustinerkirche is still their Parish church, that was rebuilt in 1843/44 by Ferdinand Stadler. In the late 1950s, the church was rebuilt in accordance with the plans for the original structure. Today the building is one of the three medieval churches in the Lindenhof district of the city of Zürich.

== Geography ==
Situated at the southwest of the Münzplatz square on Augustinergasse, west of St. Peterhofstatt square near the present Bahnhofstrasse, Augustinerkirche is named after the former Augustinian monastery, simply meaning "Augustinian Church". In the high European Middle Ages, the abbey was part of the fortifications of Zürich, situated on the lower slope the Lindenhof hill, near the small Kecinstürlin gate over the moat known as Fröschengraben or Augustinertor. The inner moat was protected by the 16th-century Schanzengraben.

Of great archeological significance are the remains of the 1st-century BC La Tène culture. Archaeological excavations and aerial surveys revealed the Celtic-Helvetii oppidum of Lindenhof. The remains were discovered in archaeological digs in 1989, 1997, 2004 and 2007 on Lindenhof, Münsterhof and Rennweg, and close to the Celtic-Roman Turicum around the Lindenhof and Sihlbühl and the Münsterhof plaza.

== History ==
The first Augustinian monks settled at the present location, then at the western ring of the town wall around 1270 AD. The monastery consisted of a Romanesque church on today's site as well as the monastic buildings built around the cloister to the north. Like the Predigerkloster monks before them, the monks were allowed to establish a cemetery at Zähringerstrasse for "prayer" (used for Dominican friars, the 'blackfriars') abbey, and repealed in 1843. The order in later years supported the Brun regime of the Guilds of Zürich. The order purchased houses in the late 13th and early 14th century, and was in close contact with the nobility and landed gentry in Zürich and the surrounding area, among them the Bilgeri family (Grimmenturm) and the House of Rapperswil, that had after their expulsion around 1345 found asylum in Rapperswil. Memorial measurements had to be held until the 14th century at Grossmünster, because thus the most income was achieved. Until the Reformation in Zürich, all income obtained with the funerals had also to be delivered to the Grossmünster abbey. Within the city, as the other mendicant orders, the Augustinians were reduced to the function of area pastors. The convent was abolished in 1524, worship in the church was discontinued, and the buildings and income of the monastery were assigned to the Augustiner Amt, then a bailiwick or administrative entity of the city of Zürich.

In 1841 the Roman Catholic community of Zürich planned to build a church to commemorate the old Augustinian church. But, as the majority of the Catholic community rejected the decisions of the First Vatican Council of 1870, the whole community was excommunicated from the Catholic church, becoming the Christkatholische Kirche der Schweiz. For the same reason, Augustinerkirche is still their parish church.

== Architecture ==
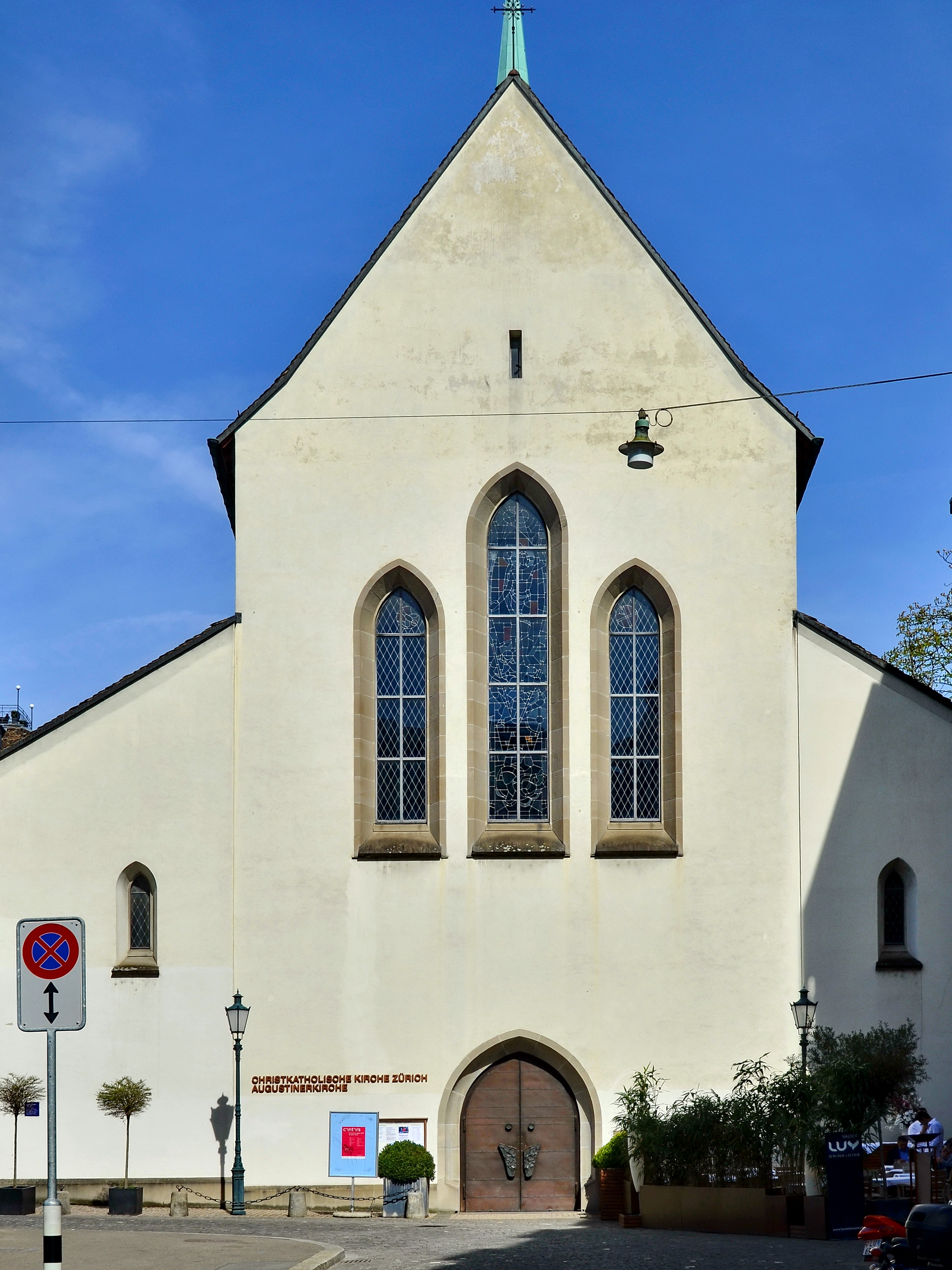
The westerly portal at the Münzplatz square

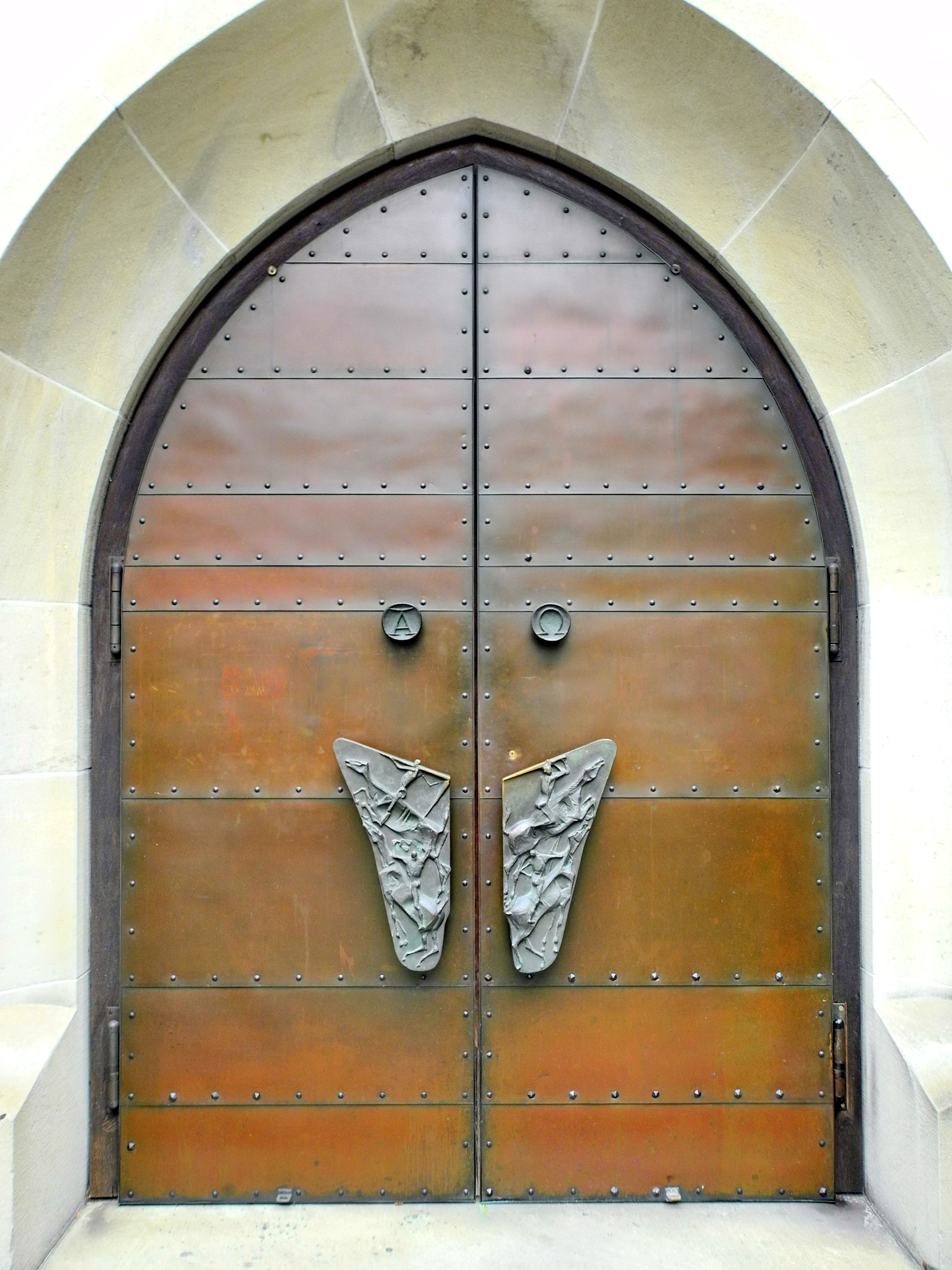

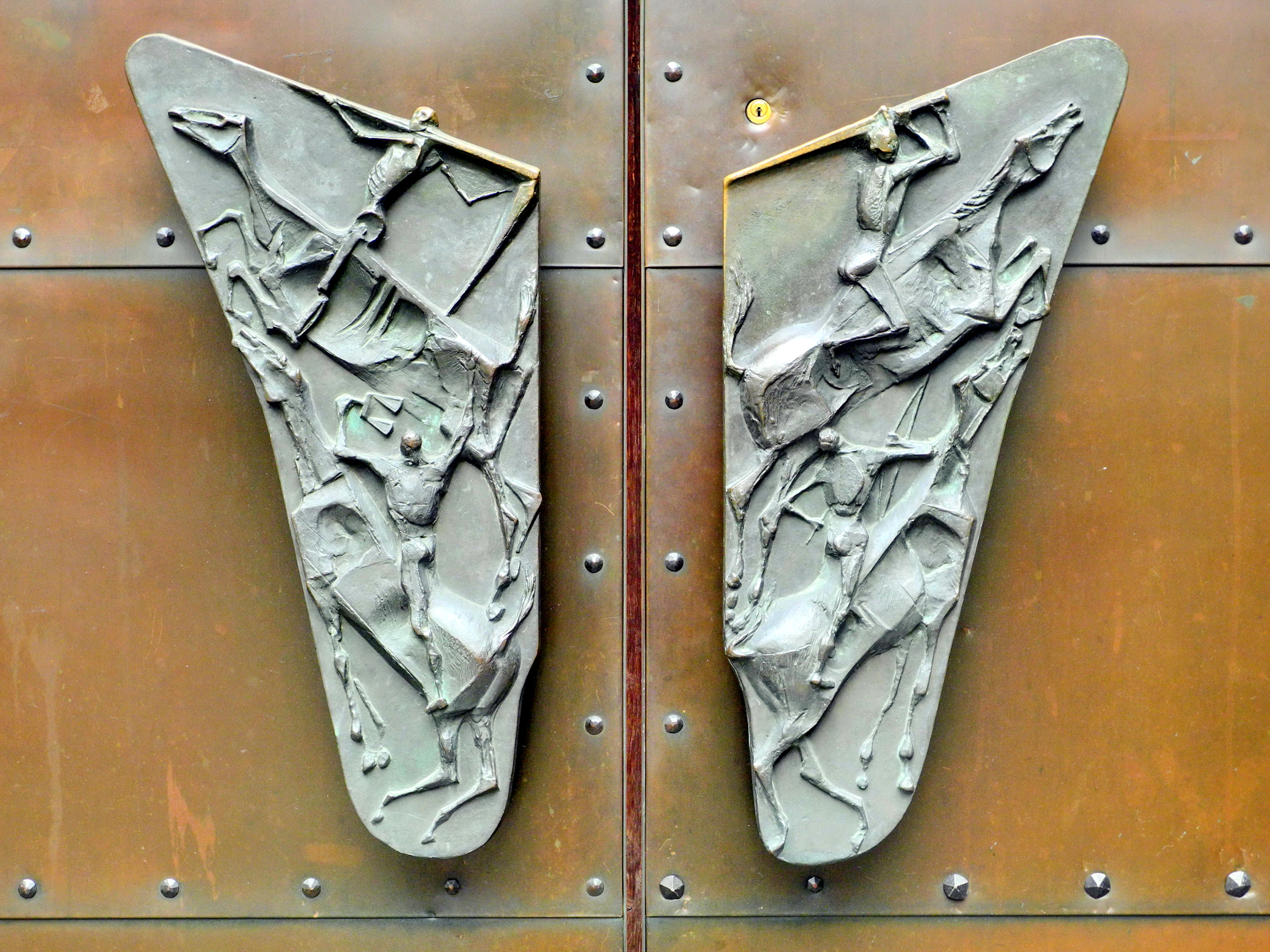

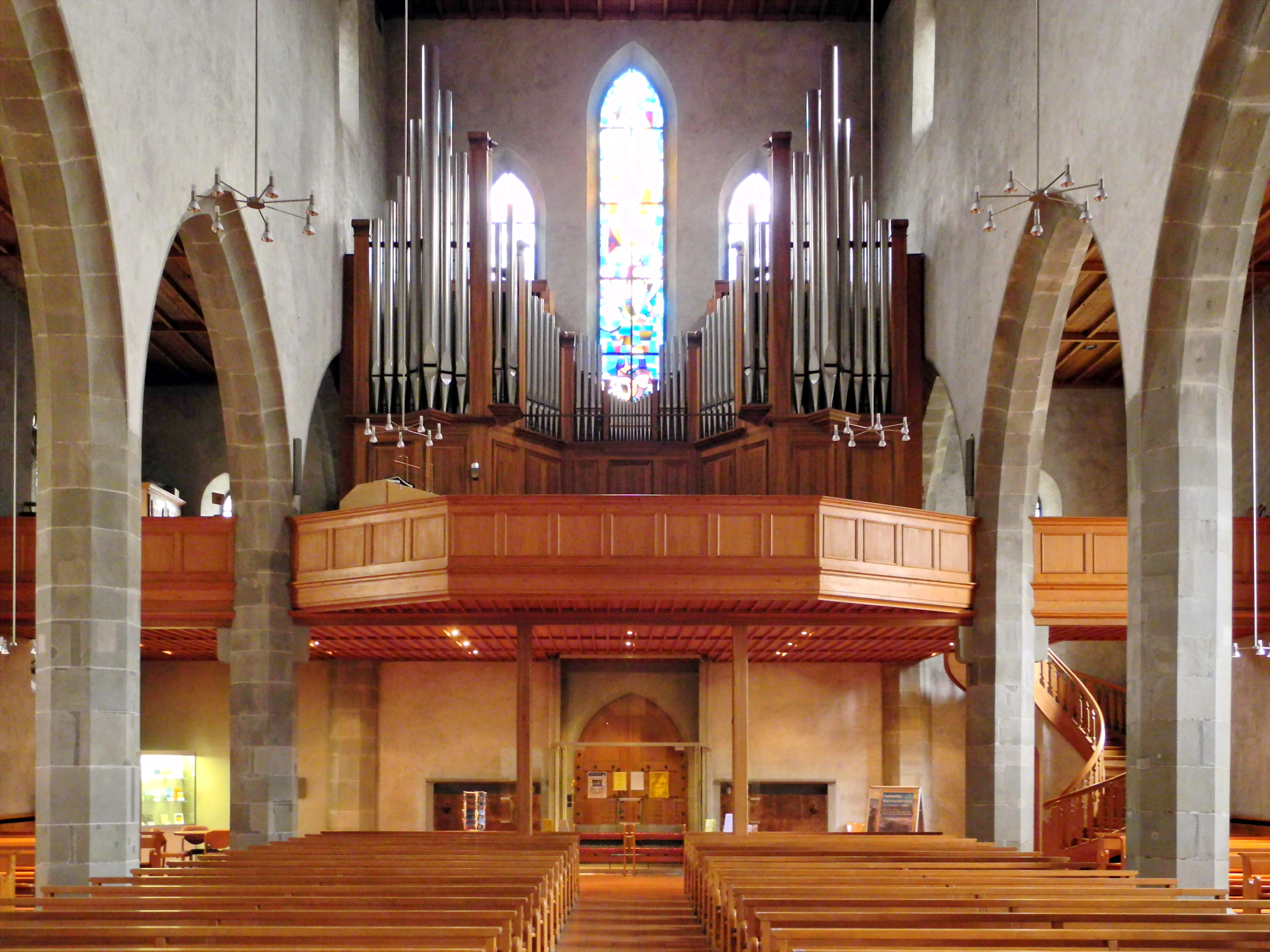
interior view towards the gallery and the pipe organ, and the western main portal.

The original Augustinian abbey was built with a Gothic architecture church around 1270 AD beside the western medieval city wall of Zürich. The church was transformed during the Reformation in Zürich into a secular workshop, and served as a mint coinage and storage space. Thus, the nave was used as a wine press, later additional floors were added to store wood and fruit. Liebfrauenkapelle, a section of the choir, served from 1596 to 1841 as mint and residential district of the mint master, and in the Jakobskapelle, the mint masters pitched their embossing dies. Therefore, the Münzplatz was named after the mint in the choir. From 1836 to 1873, the cantonal library was also situated there. However, in 1843/44 the nave was rebuilt once more to sacral purposes.

church interior towards the altar

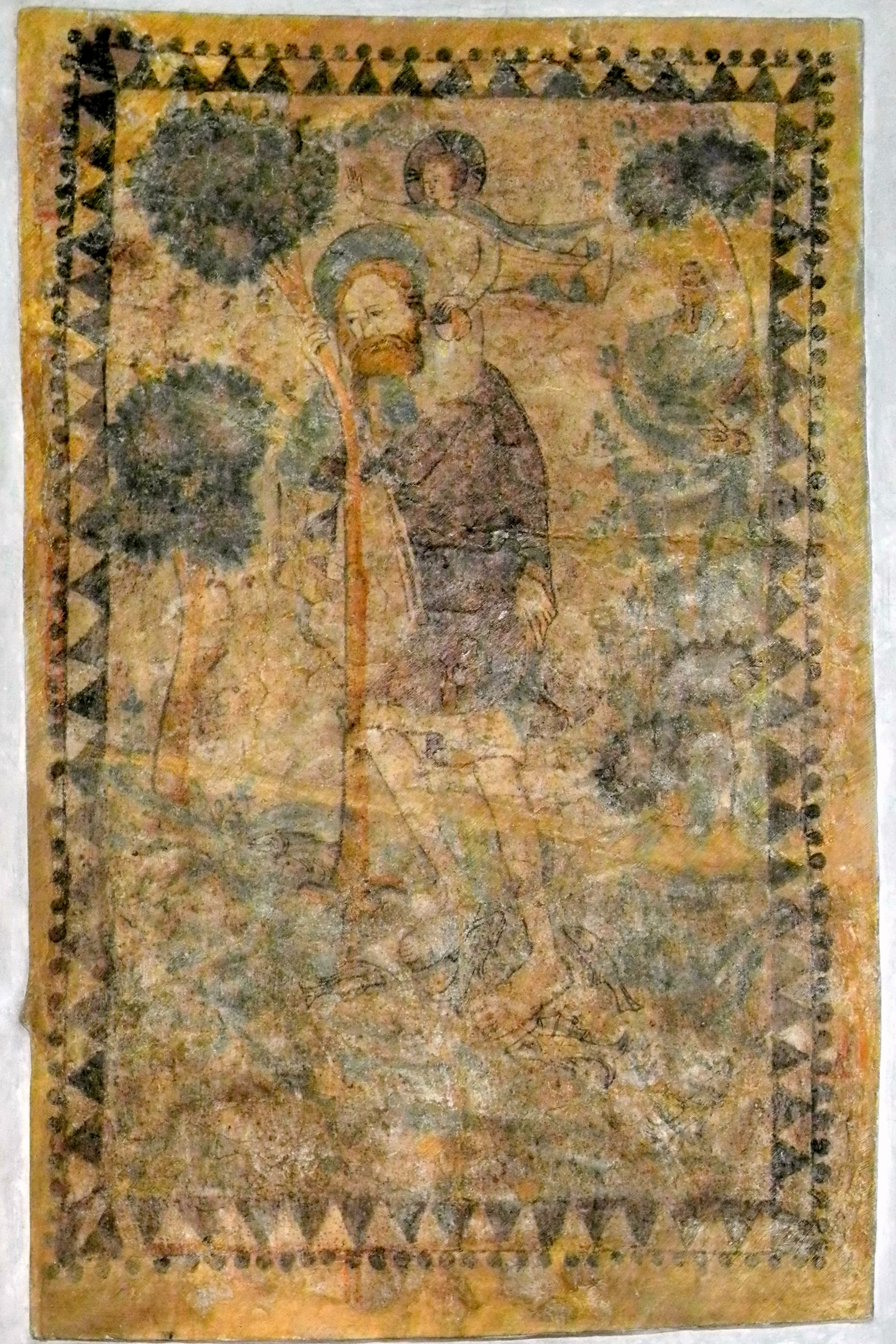
mural of Christophorus in the church

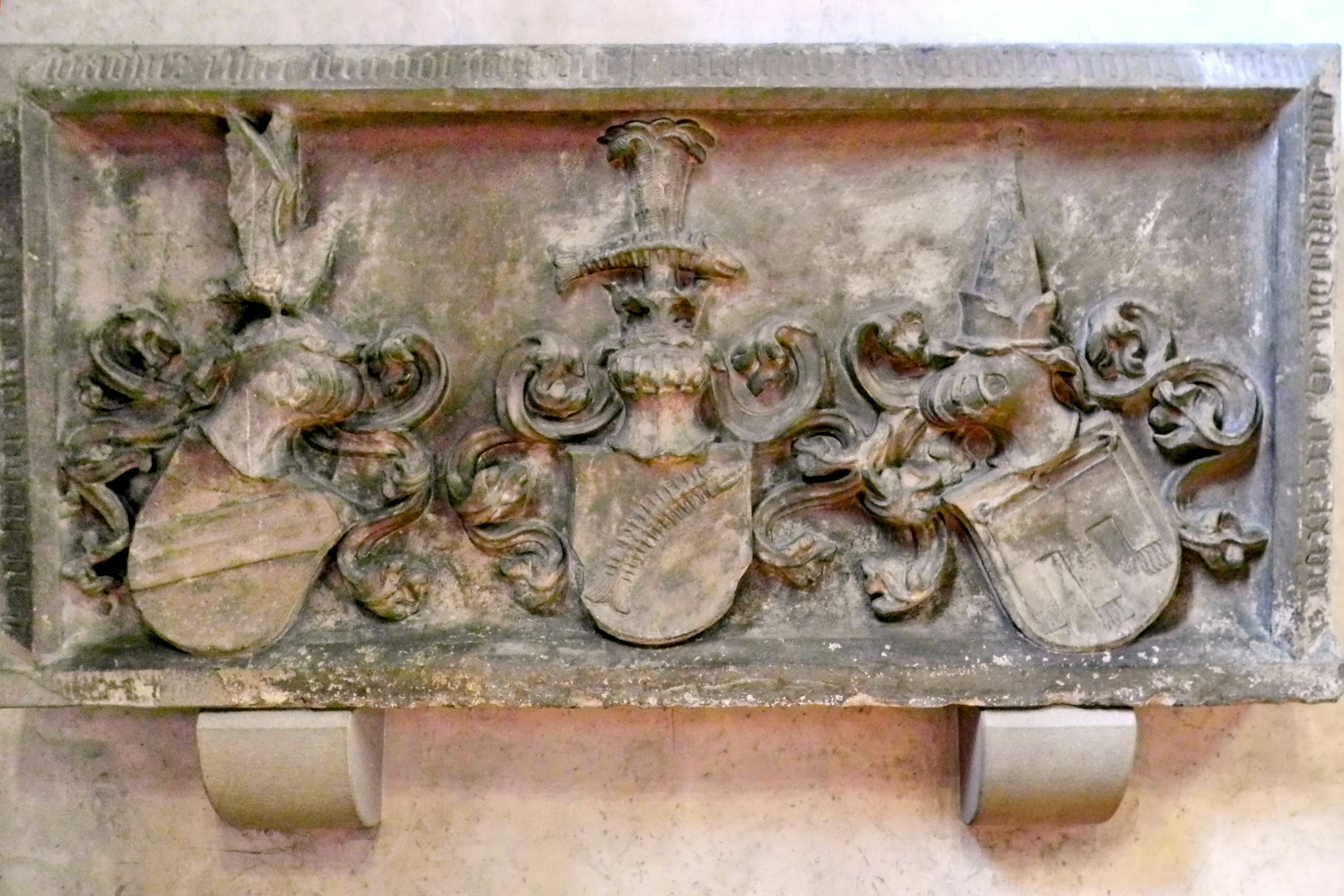
remains of the probably early 16th-century interior decoration

Baptismal font

Ferdinand Stadler (1813–1870), an architect born in Zürich, was charged with the construction of the new church building in the popular Gothic Revival style in 1843/44. Five bells cast by H. Rüetschi were installed in the bell tower (Flèche) in 1900. The present construction was renovated in 1958/59 by Max Kopp, while its medieval state of construction was re-established by removing the Gothic Revival elements. The crucifix, the altar and the baptismal font are designed by Franz Fischer, and the stained glass windows are the work of August Wanner in 1965.

== Pipe organ ==
The pipe organ in the gallery was installed by Orgelbau Th. Kuhn AG in 1959.

I Hauptwerk C–g^{3}
Quintatön	16′
Principal	8′
Spitzflöte	8′
Oktav	4′
Gedacktflöte	4′
Quinte	2^{2}/_{3}′
Superaktv	2′
Mixtur 5-7f.	1^{1}/_{3}′
Zinke	8′

II Positiv C–g^{3}
Salicional	8′
Gedackt	8′
Prinzipal	4′
Rohrflöte	4′
Sesquialtera 2f.	2^{2}/_{3}′
Oktav	2′
Nachthorn	2′
Larigot	1^{1}/_{3}′
Zimbel 3-4f.	1′
Krummhorn	8′

III Schwellwerk C–g^{3}
Liebl. Gedackt	16′
Suavial	8′
Flute harm.	8′
Liebl. Gedackt 1)	16′
Dulciana	8′
Voix céleste (ab c)	8′
Ital. Prinzipal	4′
Blockflöte	4′
Gemshorn	4′
Nazard	2^{2}/_{3}′
Flageolet	2′
Terz (ab c)	1^{3}/_{5}′
Plein jeu 5-6f.	2′
Basson	16′
Basson	16′
Tromp. harm.	8′
Oboeé	8′
Clairon	4′
Tremolo

Pedal C–f^{1}
Prinzipal	16′
Subbass	16′
Gedackt 2)	16′
Praestant	8′
Spillflöte	8′
Gedackt 2)	8′
Mixtur 4f.	2^{2}/_{3}′
Liebl. Posaune	16′
Trompete 3)	8′
Corno 3)	4′

1) Prolongation of Liebl. Gedackt 16'; 2) Transmission of Liebl. Gedackt 16'; 3) Prolongation of Liebl. Posaune 16'.

== Cultural heritage ==
The building is listed in the Swiss inventory of cultural property of national and regional significance as a Class B object of regional importance.

== Literature ==
- Regine Abegg and Christine Barraud Wiener: Die Kunstdenkmäler des Kantons Zürich. Stadt Zürich Volume II.I, published by Gesellschaft für Schweizerische Kunstgeschichte GSK, Bern 2002, ISBN.
- Christine Barraud Wiener and Regine Abegg: Die Augustinerkirche in Zürich. Schweizerische Kunstführer, Volume 661, published by Gesellschaft für Schweizerische Kunstgeschichte GSK, Bern 1999, ISBN 3-85782-661-4.
- Walter Baumann: Zürichs Kirchen, Klöster und Kapellen bis zur Reformation. Verlag Neue Zürcher Zeitung NZZ, Zürich 1994, ISBN 978-3-8582-3508-4.
