= Augustinergasse =

Street in Zurich, Switzerland

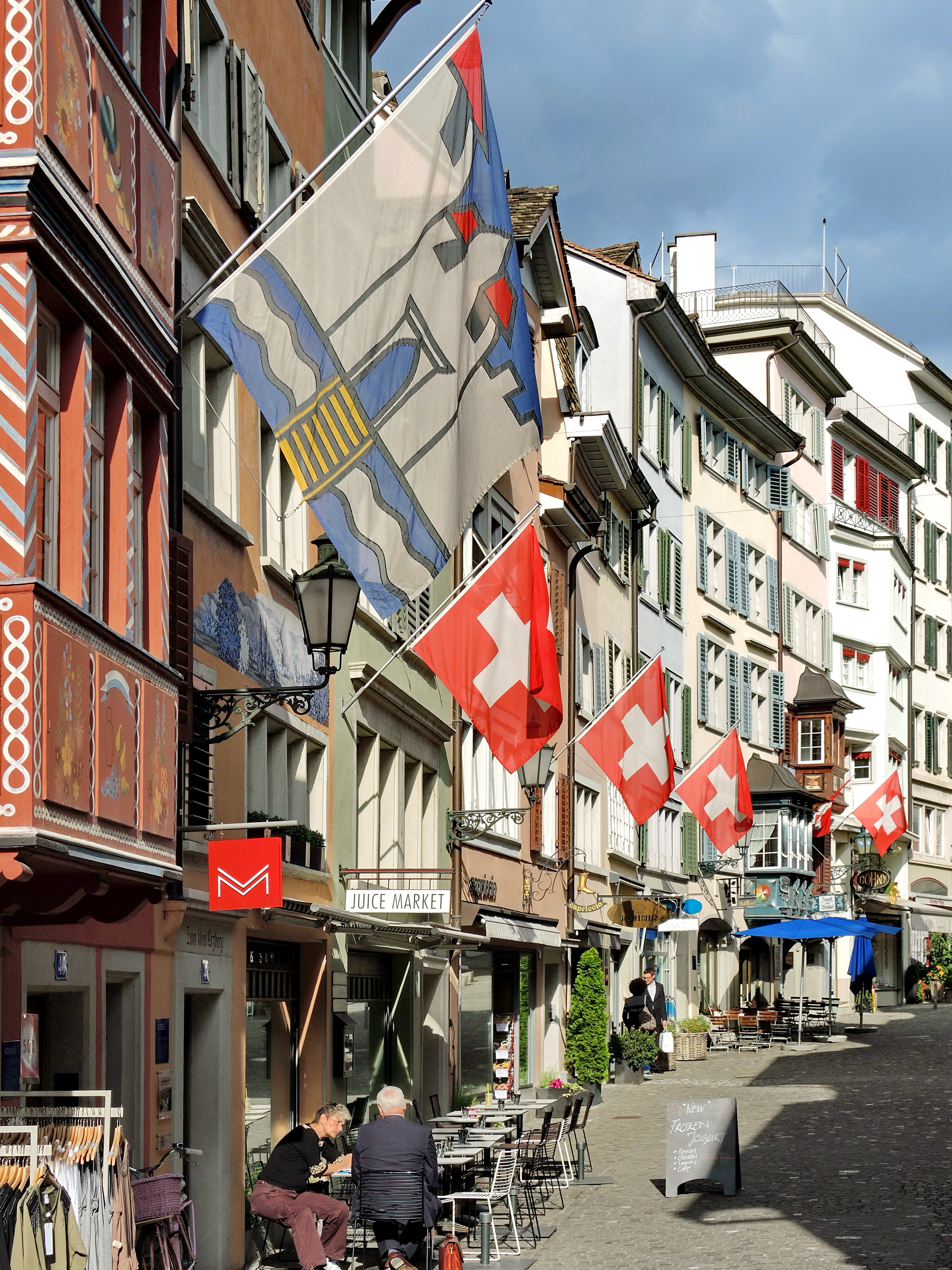
- Augustinergasse as seen from the Bahnhofstrasse road towards Münzplatz square
- Interactive map of Augustinergasse
- Type: pedestrian zone
- Owner: City of Zurich
- Length: about 200 metres (220 yd)
- Addresses: Augustinergasse
- Location: Bahnhofstrasse–Weinplatz–St. Peterhofstatt–(Münsterhof); Zurich, Switzerland
- Postal code: 8001
- Coordinates: 47°22′20.40″N 8°32′18.50″E

Construction
- Completion: probably around 1200 AD or before

Augustinergasse is a medieval lane that today is part of the innercity pedestrian zone of Zurich, Switzerland. It is named after the former Augustinian Abbey that is now Augustinerkirche, the former church of the convent that was disestablished in 1525. Once, it was one of the nodal points of road and public transportation between Münsterhof, St. Peterhofstatt, the present Münzplatz plaza at the former abbey, and one of the gates and fortifications of the medieval town walls. Today, as well as the Limmatquai, Augustinergasse is a section of the southern extension of the Seeuferanlage promenades that were built between 1881 and 1887, and one of the best known visitor attractions of the oldest area of the city of Zurich.

== Location ==
Bordered in the north by Münzplatz and by St. Peterhofstatt towards Münsterhof, it is named after the former Augustinian monastery, now the Augustinerkirche church. The Rennweg, formerly the Rennweg–Augustinergasse stop on lines 6, 7, 11 and 13 of the Zurich tram system is located some 150 metres (160 yd) further south along the Bahnhofstrasse road.

== Points of interest ==
Augustinergasse was the home of the medieval artisans of Zurich. Beginning in the 17th century, rich factory owners settled there, resulting in an open 'competition' for the best facade. Tourist highlights are the numerous carved wooden oriel windows of these colourful houses, along with some mostly tourist-oriented shops, coffeehouses and restaurants; thus the tiny lane is probably one of the most colorful streets in Zurich. Much more modestly decorated is the exterior of the former monastery's church, the Augustinerkirche that as of today is the parish church of the Christ Catholic community of Zurich.

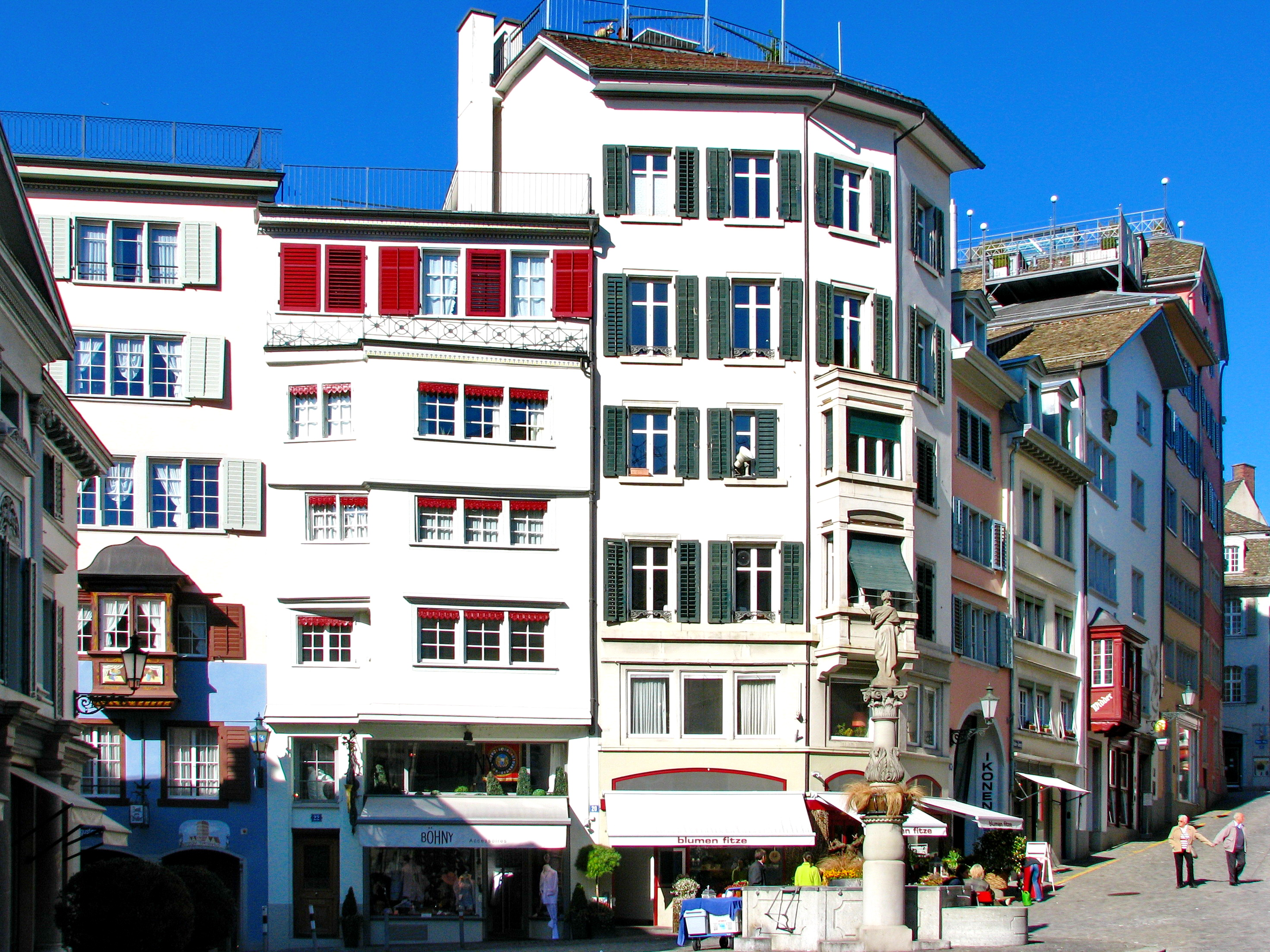
Münzplatz, Glockengasse to the right

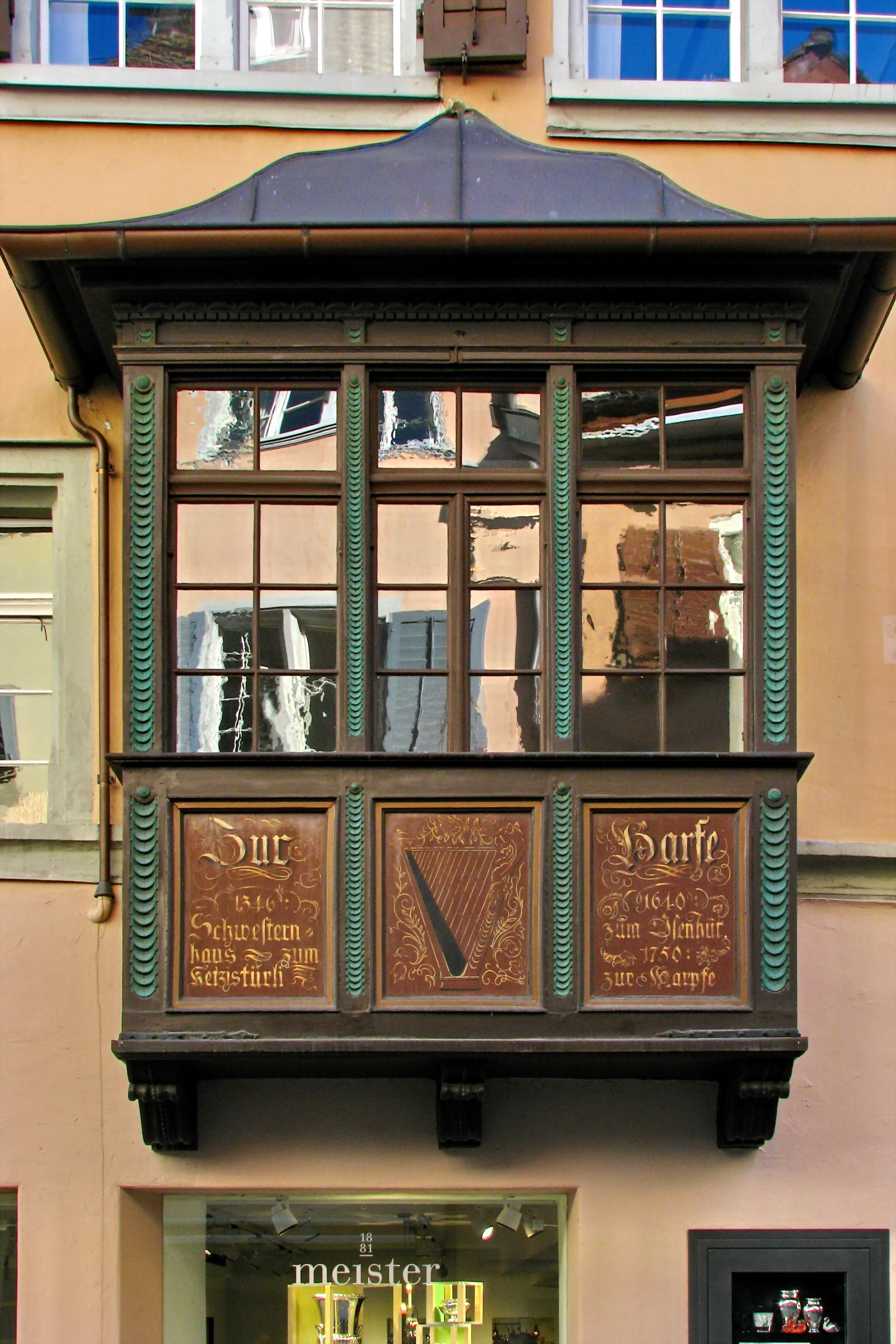
One of the 'typical' oriel windows

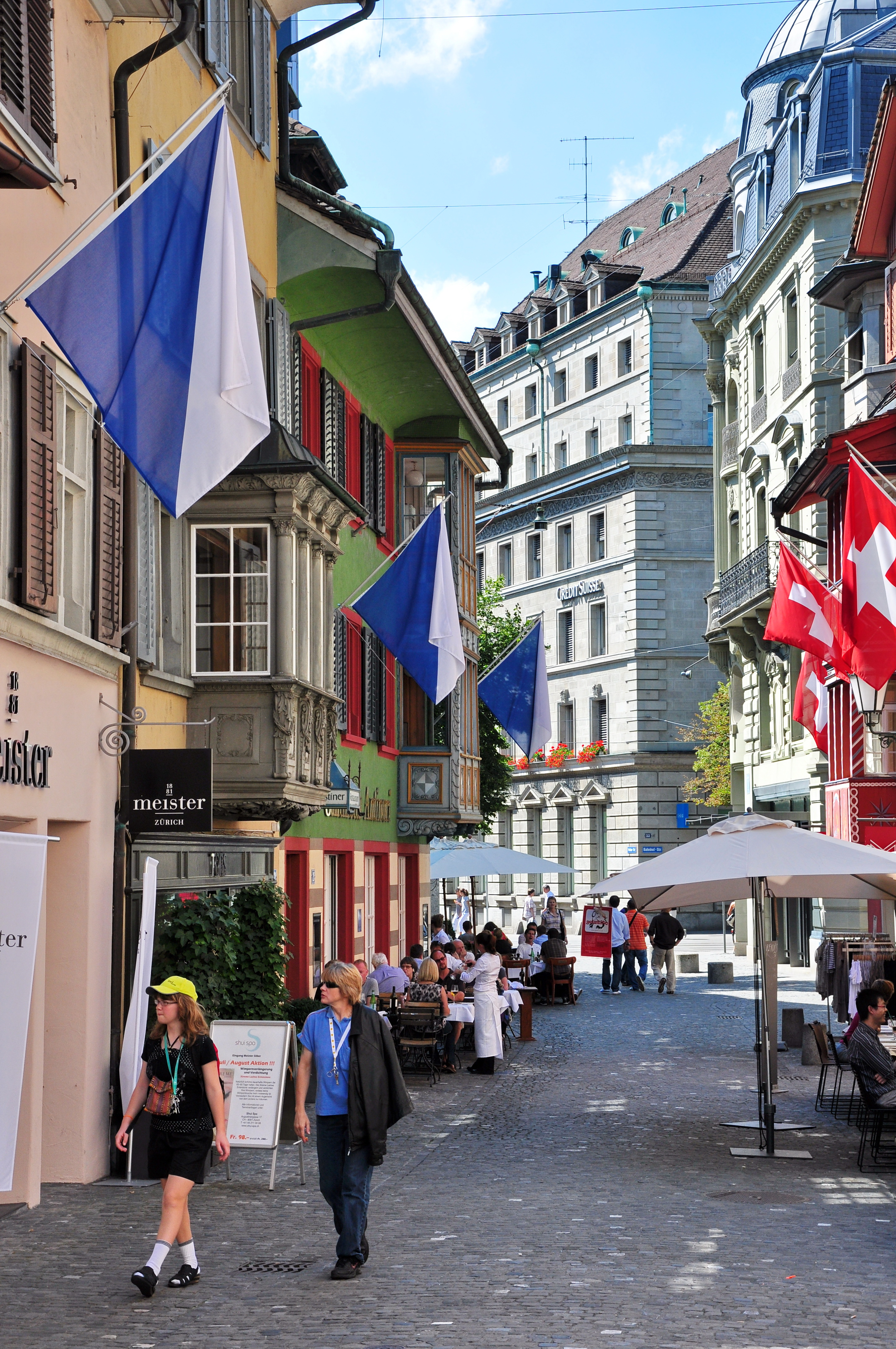
As seen from Münzplatz towards Bahnhofstrasse

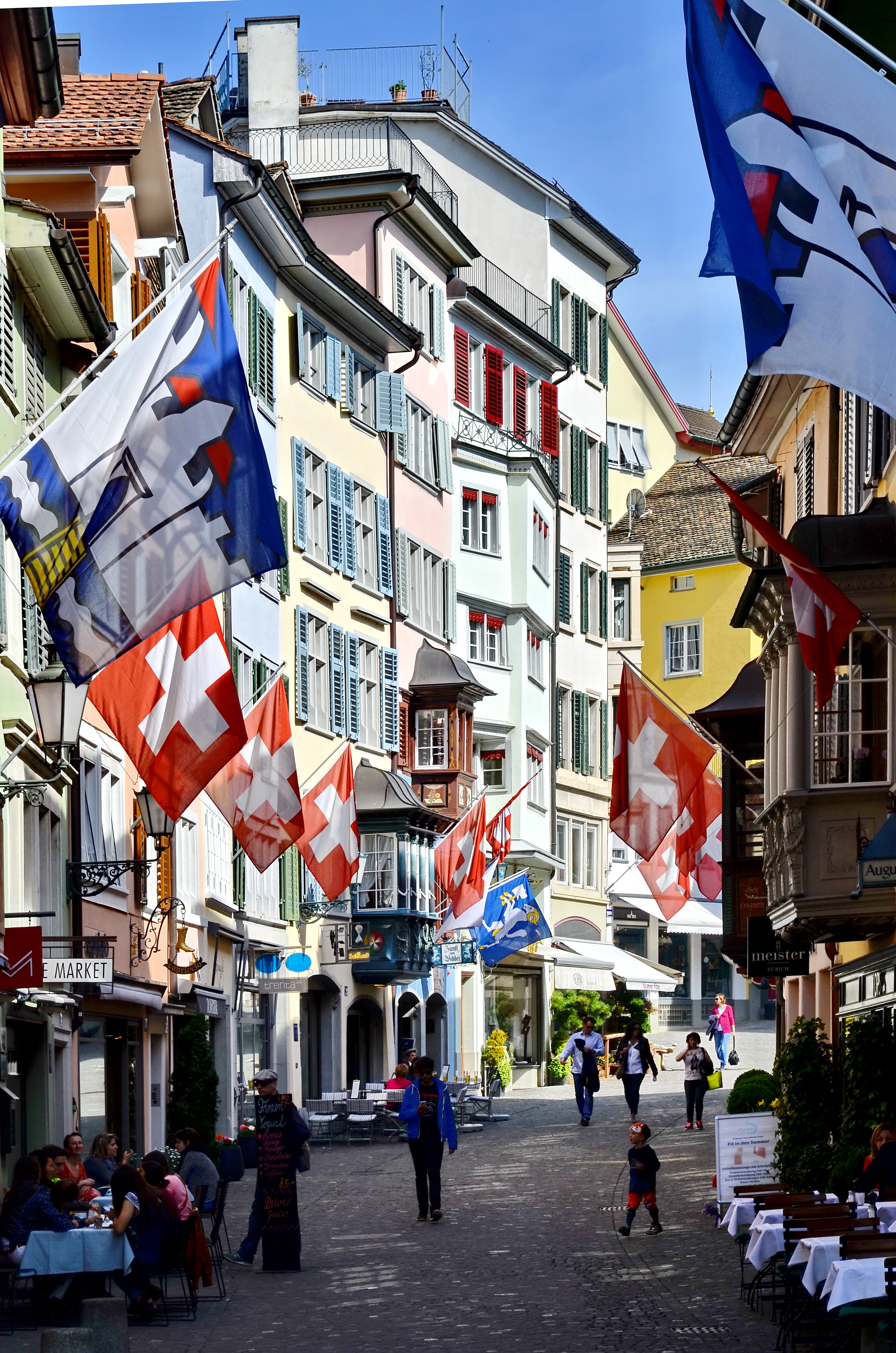
As seen from Bahnhofstrasse, buildings decorated for Sechseläuten 2015

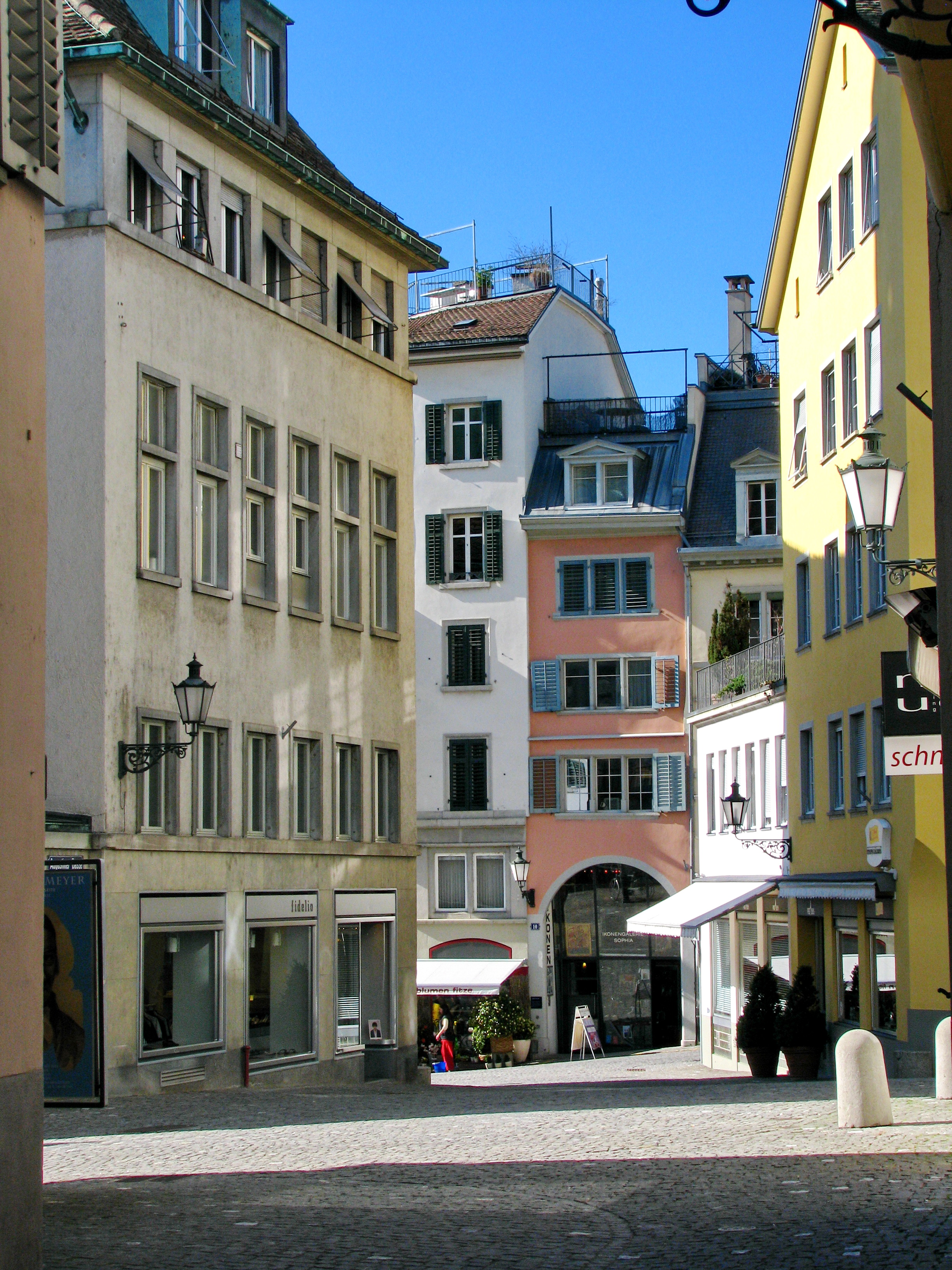
Upper Augustinergasse

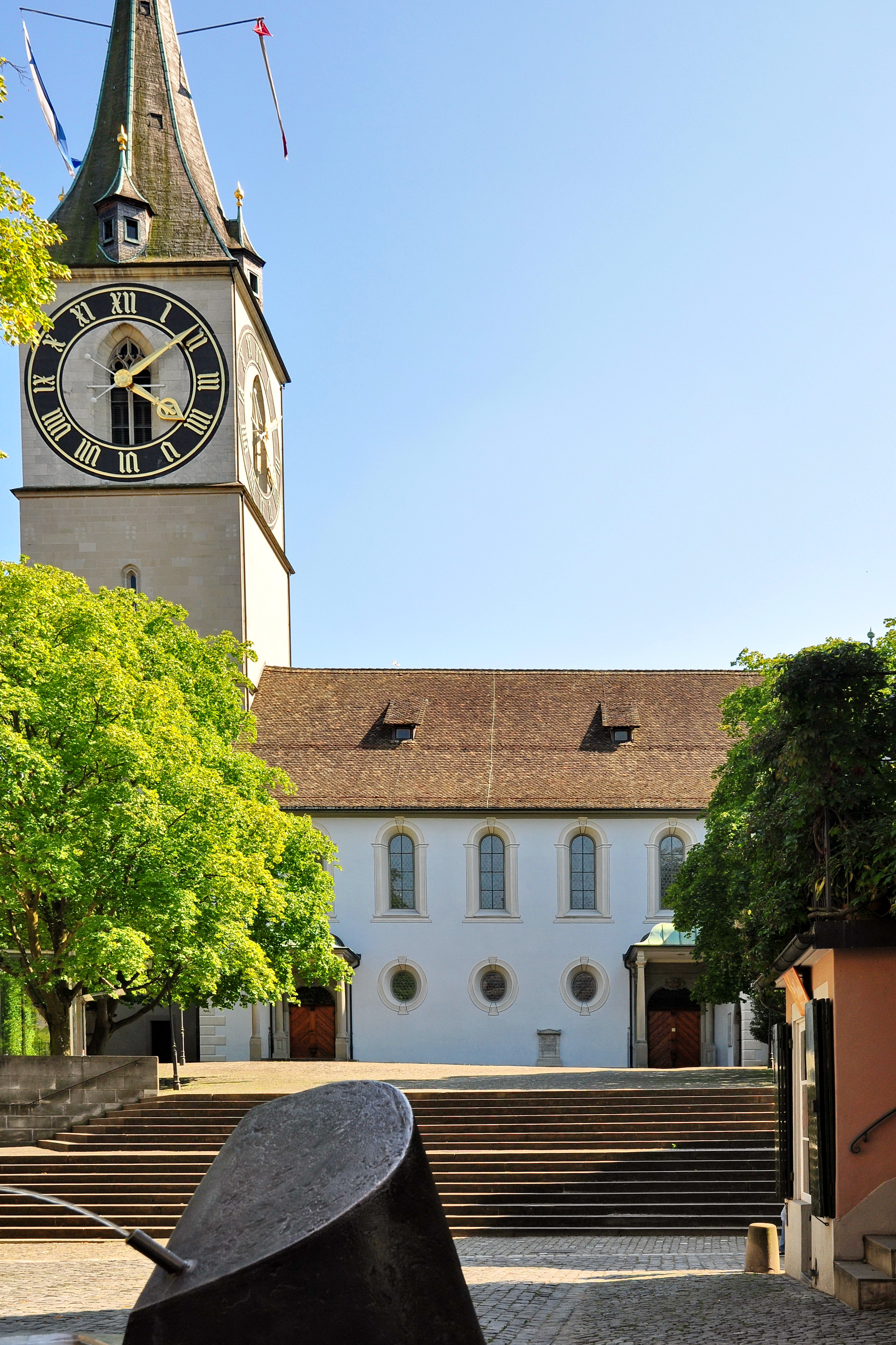
St. Peterhofstatt and St. Peter church

=== Münzplatz ===
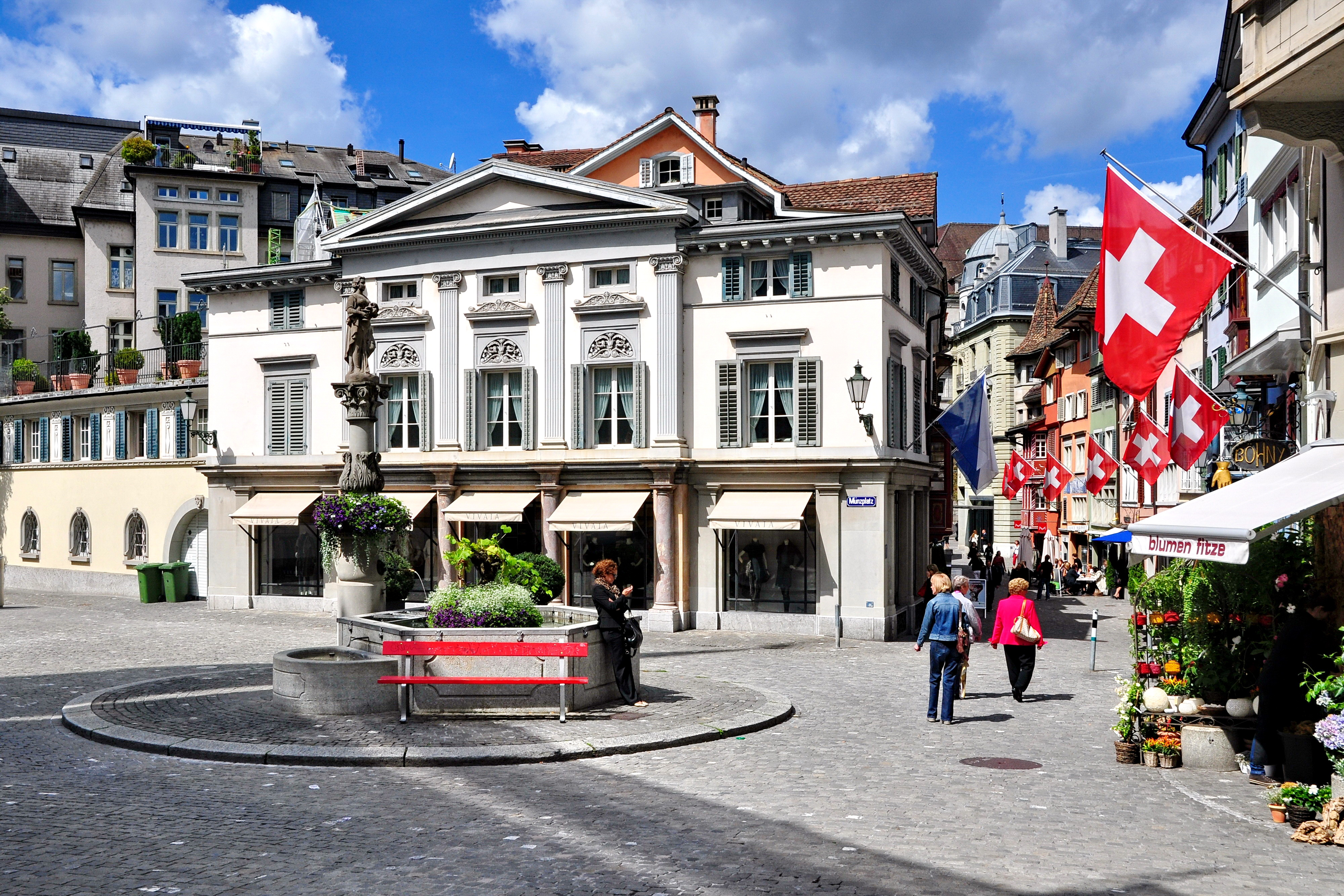
Münzplatz and Folderbrunnen, Augustinerkirche to the left, Seminarienhaus in the centre and Augustinergasse to the right

The Augustinian church was transformed during the Reformation in Zurich into a secular workshop, and served as a mint coinage and storage space. From 1596 to 1841 its choir served as mint and residential district of the mint master, and in the Jakobskapelle, the mint masters pitched their embossing dies. Therefore, the Münzplatz was named after the mint in the choir. The so-called Folderbrunnen was built in 1537 as the local water well, and is still a popular meeting point of locals and tourists.

=== Augustinerkirche ===
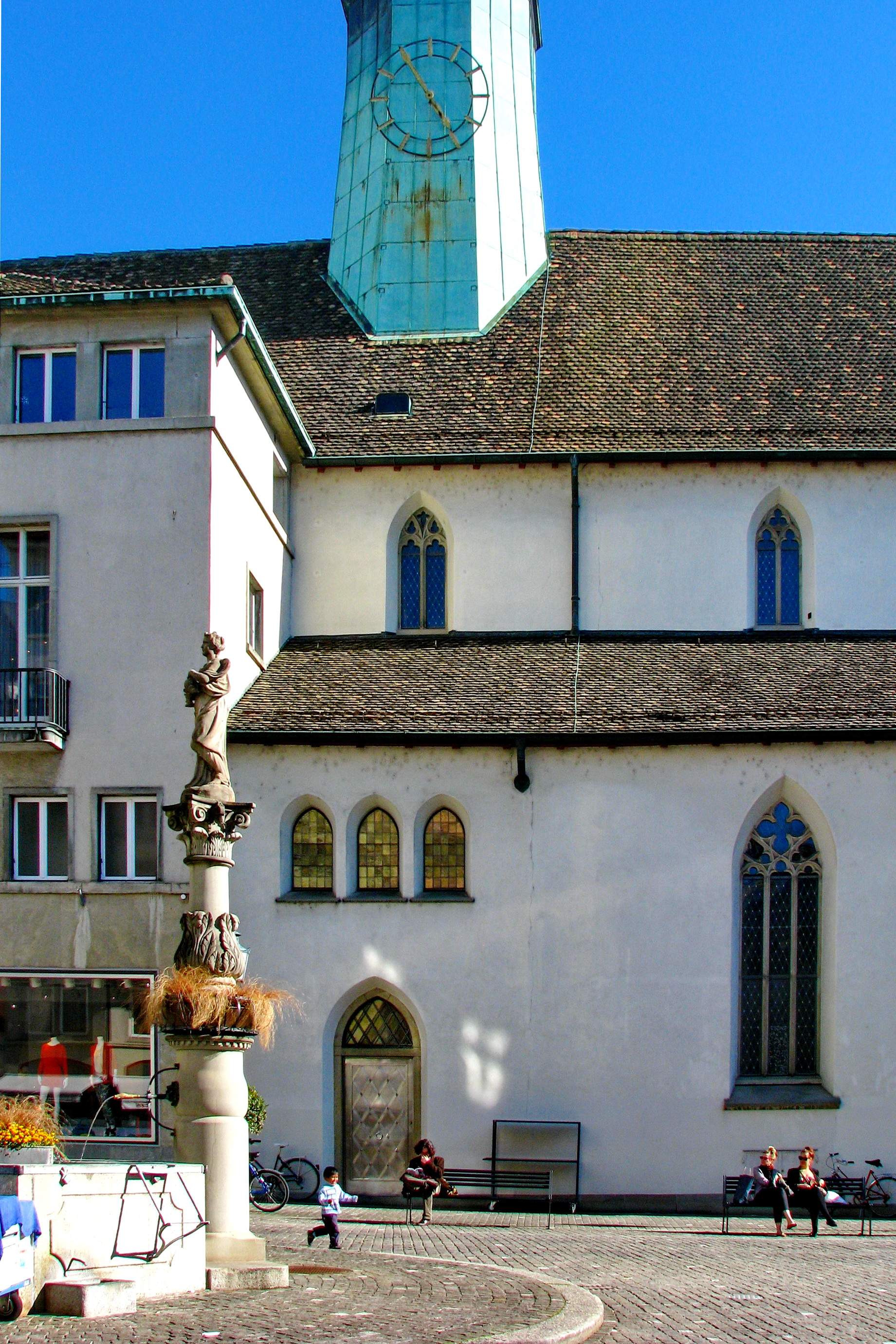
Augustinerkirche as seen from Münzplatz

Augustinerkirche was once one of the five main churches in the medieval town of Zurich. First built around 1270 as a Romanesque church belonging to the Augustinian abbey, on occasion of the Reformation, worship in the church was discontinued. In 1841 the Roman Catholic community of Zurich planned to rebuild the building to commemorate the old Augustinian church. But, as the majority of the Catholic community rejected the decisions of the First Vatican Council of 1870, the whole community was expelled from the Catholic church. For the same reason, Augustinerkirche is still their parish church. Today the building is one of the three medieval churches in the Lindenhof district of the city of Zurich.

== History ==
In the European Middle Ages, it was as it is in the present days, a small street within the fortifications of Zurich, leading from St. Peterhofstatt at the St. Peter church, passing the former Augustinian monastery below Lindenhof hill, towards the so-called small Kecinstürlin gate at the southern Fröschengraben moat, and the Rennwegtor. The inner moat was enforced by the later built Schanzengraben. But, historical and scientifically more interesting, around the 1st century BC La Tène culture, archaeologists excavated individual and aerial finds of the Celtic-Helvetii oppidum Lindenhof, whose remains were discovered in archaeological campaigns in the years 1989, 1997, 2004 and 2007 on Lindenhof, Münsterhof and Rennweg, and also in the 1900s, but the finds mistakenly were identified as Roman objects. Not yet archaeologically proven but suggested by the historians, as well for the first construction of today's Münsterbrücke Limmat crossing, the present Weinplatz square was the former civilian harbour of the Celtic-Roman Turicum.

== Augustinerturm ==
Augustinerturm was the tower named after the Augustinian priory, and was part of the third, left-bank fortifications. It was situated close to the Augustinerkirche. There are findings of strong tower remains, which were brought to light on occasion of the foundation work at present Bahnhofstrasse 40. It is believed that the three upper, and later built timbered floors were blown open on the side towards to the city; thus it must have been a gigantic fortification. The attached fort was demolished in 1811.

== Augustinertor and Augustinerbollwerk ==
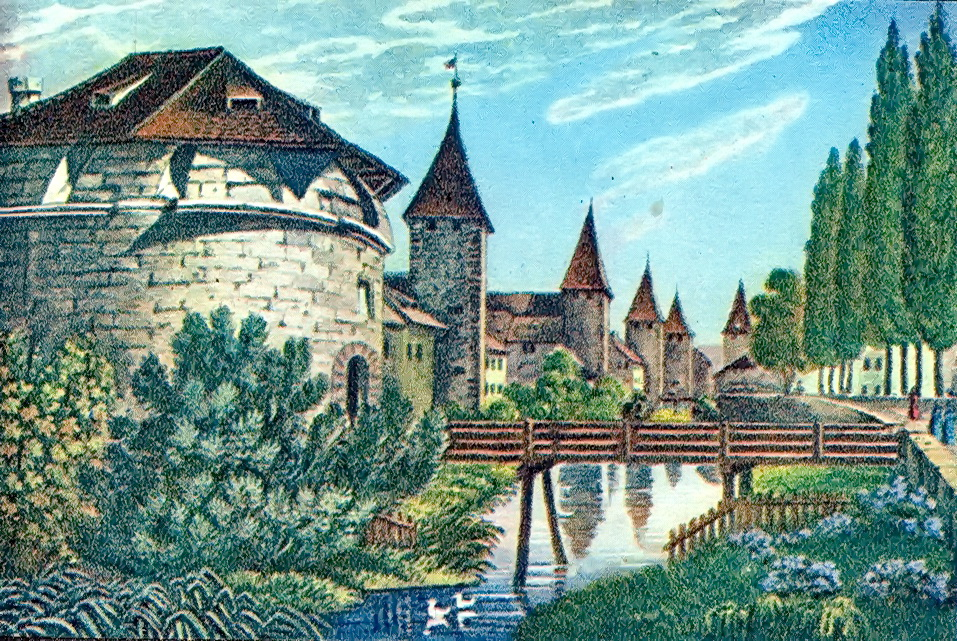
Augustinertor and Fröschengraben around 1800

Augustinertor and Augustinerbollwerk were named after the Augustinian priory, and were also part of the 16th-century fortifications. They were situated close to the present Augustinerkirche. In 1575 the prior gate "Kecinstürlin", a small gate, was replaced, and the construction lasted to 1578. There are no further details documented, but the bulwark was probably a circular, heavy, unadorned building at the Fröschengraben moat. Usually, enthroned above the gate were the coat of arms of Zurich, made of stone. It is assumed that the bulwark may have not been entered with carts, as the previous Ketzinstürli; thus, the gate of the bulwark was established only for passenger services. The gate also was known as Augustinertörlein, meaning the small Augustinian gate. On the later map series of Bullinger and on the drawings by the illustrator Franz Hegi, the bastion had a red tile roof. The bulwark was demolished between 1811 and 1813.

== See also ==
- Augustinerkirche Zürich
- Augustinerkloster Zürich
- Schanzengraben
- Turicum (Zürich)

== Literature ==
- Christine Barraud Wiener and Peter Jezler: Die Stadt Zürich I. Stadt vor der Mauer, mittelalterliche Befestigung und Limmatraum. In: Die Kunstdenkmäler des Kantons Zürich, Wiese Verlag, Basel 1999, ISBN 978-3-9061-3171-9.
