= Guy Stern =

German-American military interrogator (1922–2023)

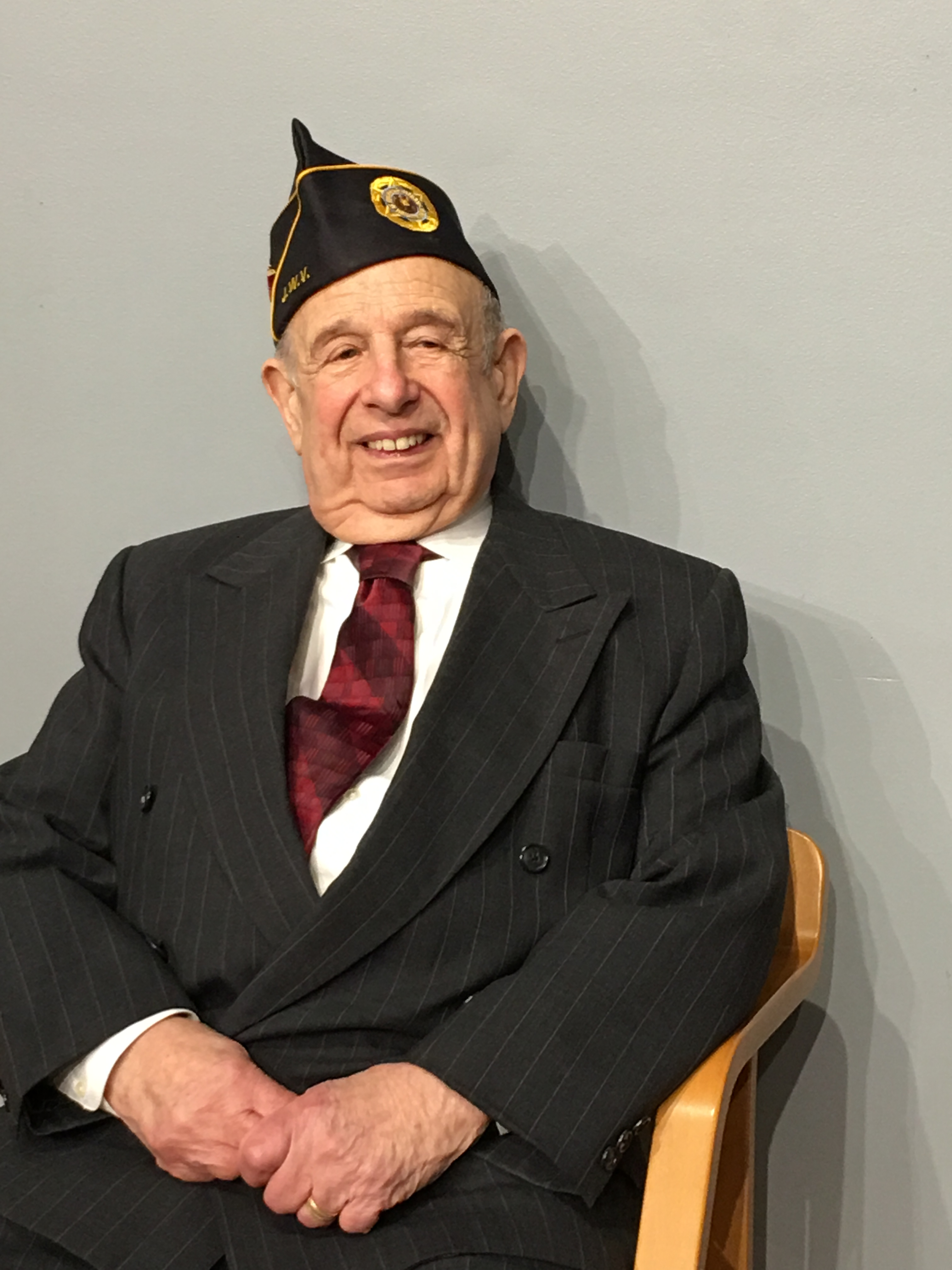
- Stern receiving the French Medal of Honor
- Born: Günther Stern; January 14, 1922; Hildesheim, Hanover, Prussia, Germany
- Died: December 7, 2023 (aged 101); Detroit, Michigan, US
- Resting place: Great Lakes National Cemetery
- Citizenship: United States (after 1937)
- Spouses: Judith S. Owens (died 2003) Susanna Piontek (after 2003)
- Children: 1

Academic background
- Education: Saint Louis University: Hofstra University (BA); Columbia University (MA, PhD)

Günther "Guy" Stern (January 14, 1922 – December 7, 2023) was a German-American decorated member of the secret Ritchie Boys World War II military intelligence interrogation team. As the only person from his Jewish family to flee Nazi Germany, he came to the United States and later served in the US Army conducting frontline interrogations.

After World War II, he graduated from Columbia University and became a scholar, primarily of German and comparative literature. He worked at the Holocaust Memorial Center in Farmington Hills, Michigan.

== Early life ==
Günther Stern was born on January 14, 1922, the son of Julius Stern and Hedwig Stern (née Silberberg). He and his family, including a younger brother, Werner, and a younger sister, Eleonore, resided in Hildesheim, Germany. His father owned his own business, working as a salesman of clothing materials. Stern had a love for literature and music at a young age and enjoyed going to the theatre and opera with his parents on the weekends.

== Journey to America ==
After witnessing the start of anti-Semitic policies under the Nazis, Stern's parents hatched a plan to send him to the United States to stay with his Uncle Benno and Aunt Ethel. His aunt and uncle had to ensure they had the finances to support him and that the affidavit would clear, meaning he would not become a public charge to the government. They did so by borrowing money from friends and returning it all after the record statements came through. To prepare for his trip, Stern's parents took him out of high school and hired an English tutor for him. With the help of an American-Jewish agency and a well-meaning consular official in Hamburg, Stern left Germany on November 5, 1937, and headed to St. Louis.

Stern graduated from Soldan High School in 1939. He worked as a busboy and dishwasher at two hotels in St. Louis. He became active in his school community, joining the newspaper team and landing interviews with figures like Benny Goodman and Thomas Mann. In 1940, he attended Saint Louis University and studied Romance languages.

== Ritchie Boys ==
In 1942, Stern volunteered for naval intelligence but was initially rejected because he was not born in the United States. He wanted to join the war effort in hopes of defeating the Nazis and reuniting with his family. He was later drafted in 1943, beginning weeks of basic training and legally changing his name from Günther to Guy in case of capture by enemies. In 1944, he was sent to Camp Ritchie in Maryland, becoming a member of the Ritchie Boys, a special military intelligence unit composed of German, Austrian, and Czech refugees and immigrants to the United States, mostly Jewish immigrants. There he studied enemy intelligence and different uniforms, memorized battle orders and aerial maps, and mostly learned how to conduct interrogations.

The four most useful interrogation tactics he learned were the power of knowledge, bribery, common interests, and invoking fear, all to be done without violating the Geneva Conventions on Warfare. They were taught to separate any emotional and private aspects they may come across during interrogations. After months of training, Stern and the other Ritchie Boys returned to Europe on D-Day, where he became a member of a six-man IPW (Interrogators of Prisoners of War) Team 41. After several successful interrogations, Stern was promoted to head of his team and prepared various reports based on answers from prisoners for his commanders. These ranged from the German railroad system to German preparations for chemical warfare.

Stern became close with another German-born interrogator, Fred Howard, and they formed new tactics to use like the good cop, bad cop routine to scare prisoners of war and defectors. One of their most important interrogations included learning about the execution of two fellow Ritchie Boys of another team, Staff Sergeant Richard Jacobs and Technician 5th Grade Murray Zappler, leading to the capture and trial of their murderer, Curt Bruns.

Stern earned the Bronze Star Medal for the intelligence he gathered during the war.

== Post-War ==
Once the war was over, Stern visited Hildesheim again where he learned that his family's home had been taken by the Nazi government in 1938 and they had been moved to a "Jew House". After talking to locals still in the area he learned they had ended up at the Warsaw Ghetto and had perished there.

Stern moved back to New York City and returned to his studies, receiving a Bachelor of Arts in Romance languages in 1948 from Hofstra University, and then a Master of Arts in 1950 and Doctor of Philosophy in 1954 from Columbia University. After teaching at Columbia, he received an assistant professorship at Denison University in Ohio. In 1954 he taught at the Seminarienhaus in Zürich which was then owned by Ohio's Heidelberg University. He was later professor and head of the department for German language and literature at the University of Cincinnati in the 1960s. In 1969, Stern was elected president of the American Association of Teachers of German (AATG). He was later head of the German and Slavic studies department at the University of Maryland, then until his retirement served as a distinguished professor of German literature and cultural history at Wayne State University and was vice president of academic affairs and provost from 1978 to 1980. He was a visiting scholar at the German universities of Freiburg im Breisgau and Frankfurt am Main.

Stern was the director of the Harry and Wanda Zekelman International Institute of the Righteous at the Holocaust Memorial Center in Farmington Hills (near Detroit). He was one of the founders of the Lessing Society (University of Cincinnati, 1966), acting as its president from 1975 until 1977. As author and editor, he published several books and compilations on German literary history.

Stern received several awards throughout his life, among them the Great Cross of Merit of the Federal Republic of Germany (1987) and the Goethe Medal (1989). In 1988, he received an honorary doctorate from Hofstra University. He was named a Knight of the Legion of Honor for freeing France during the war and was recognized as an honorary citizen of Hildesheim. A plaque has been placed in front of the area that was once his home as a tribute to his family. He also received an honorary doctorate from the University of Hildesheim. Days after his passing, he was unanimously elected to be Director Emeritus of Fisher House Michigan.

Stern was featured in the 2022 Ken Burns PBS documentary The U.S. and the Holocaust and interviewed by 60 Minutes about his Richie Boys training and work experiences.

== Personal life and death ==
Stern married a teacher named Judith S. Owens. She died in 2003. He remarried, to German author Susanna Piontek. He also had an adopted son who proceeded him in death.

Stern was one of the last surviving Ritchie Boys. He turned 100 on January 14, 2022, and died on December 7, 2023, aged 101, in Detroit. He was interred at Great Lakes National Cemetery in Holly, Michigan.

== Selected works ==
- Invisible Ink: A Memoir. Detroit: Wayne State University Press. 2020. ISBN 978-0-8143-4759-1.
- Fielding, Wieland, Goethe and the Rise of the Novel. Frankfurt am Main, Peter Lang Verlag, 2003.
- Literarische Kultur im Exil. Gesammelte Beiträge zur Exilforschung (1989–1997). Dresden University Press 1998.
- Literatur im Exil. Gesammelte Aufsätze 1959–1989. Ismaning 1989.
- (Edited with Gustave Mathieu) Introduction to German Poetry. Dover. 1991. ISBN 978-0-486-26713-5. OCLC 742447008.
- War, Weimar and Literature: The Story of the Neue Merkur, 1914–1925. University Park: Pennsylvania State University Press 1971.
