= Schanzengraben =

Historic site in Switzerland

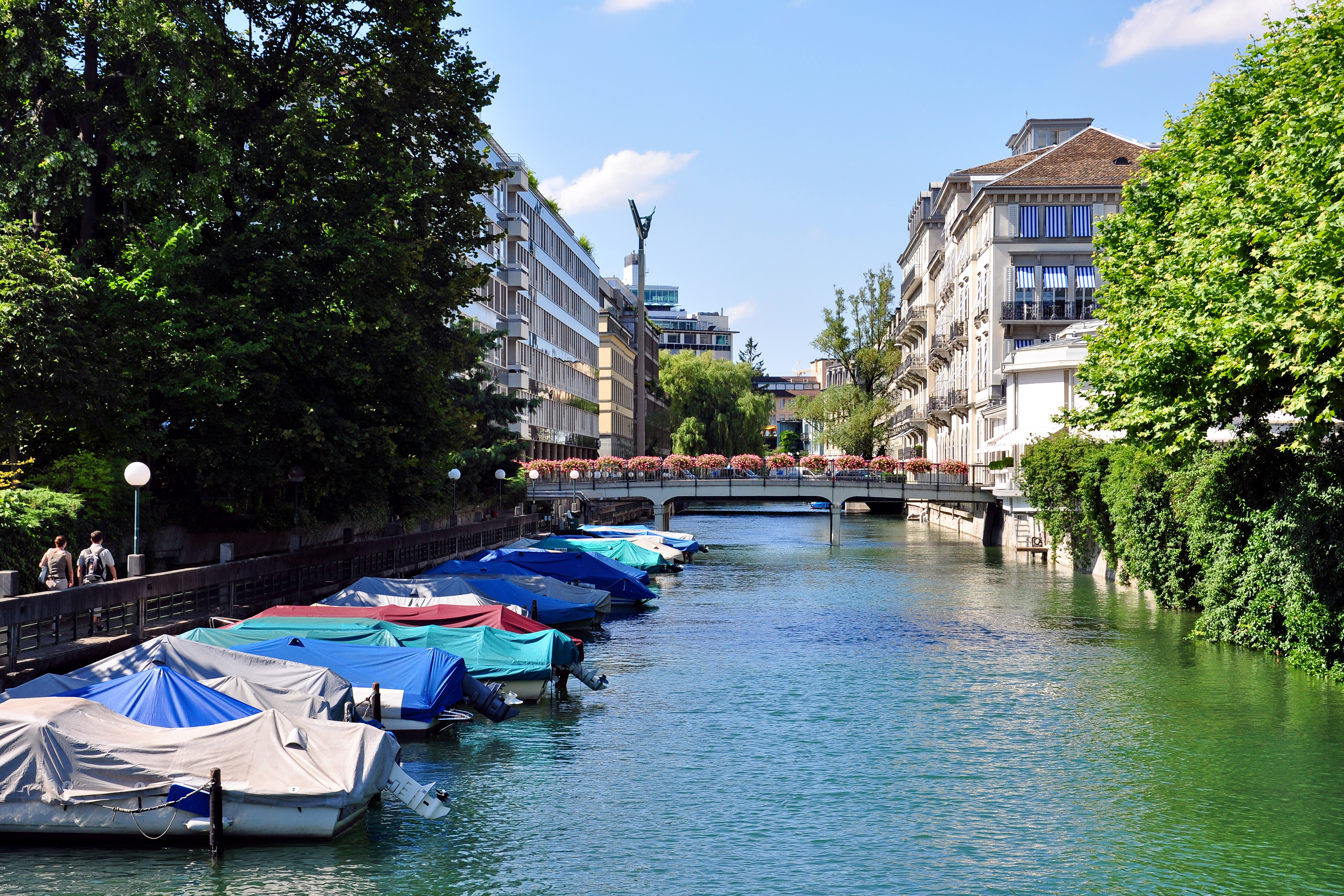
- Schanzengraben as seen from the General-Guisan-Quai, Hotel Baur au Lac to the right
- Interactive map of Schanzengraben
- 47°22′16″N 8°32′1″E
- Location: General-Guisan-Quai respectively Lake Zurich–Sihl in Zürich

History
- Built: around 1642

Site notes
- Architectural style: Baroque
- Governing body: City of Zürich

Schanzengraben is a moat and a section of the northwestern extension of the Seeuferanlage promenades that were built between 1881 and 1887 in Zurich, Switzerland. Schanzengraben is, among the adjoint Katz bastion at the Old Botanical Garden and the so-called Bauschänzli bulwark, one of the last remains of the Baroque fortifications of Zürich. The area of the moat is also an inner-city recreation area and a public park.

== Geography ==
Schanzengraben is one of the two present effluences of the Lake Zurich, located around 250 metres (820 ft) south of the Limmat, and situated at the historical Alpenquai lake shore area, between Bürkliplatz and General-Guisan-Quai. It marks the border of the inner-city districts of Enge and City, and flows after about 1,150 metres (3,773 ft) into the Sihl, at the western side of Zürich Hauptbahnhof where Gessnerallee and Usteristrasse cross the Gessner bridge. In fact, the moat was built outside of the historical core of the medieval town of Zürich, previously the Celtic-Roman Turicum, an area being then called Aussersihl, meaning that it was outside of the Baroque town wall at the Sihl river delta.

== Points of interests ==
The lake shore area also serves as a marina associated to the Hafen Enge. A narrow alley was partially built at the level of the moat, but also crosses underneath the General-Guisan-Quai and four road bridges, namely Börsenstrasse, Stockerstrasse, Pelikanstrasse and Sihlstrasse, as well as four pedestrian bridges. In addition to the so-called Seeuferanlage and its neighboring General-Guisan-Quai, there is nearby the Arboretum and the Voliere Zürich, Other attractions include the historical Enge quarter, but mainly the Old Botanical Garden and its arboretum. There is also a unique public bath just for men (Männerbad) that also serves as an event restaurant. That section of the moat is also used as a ground for canoeing and a 'water stadion' for canoe waterball. Probably the most natural part is situated nearby the mouth into the Sihl, where also some waterbirds and even fish found an inner-city refugium.

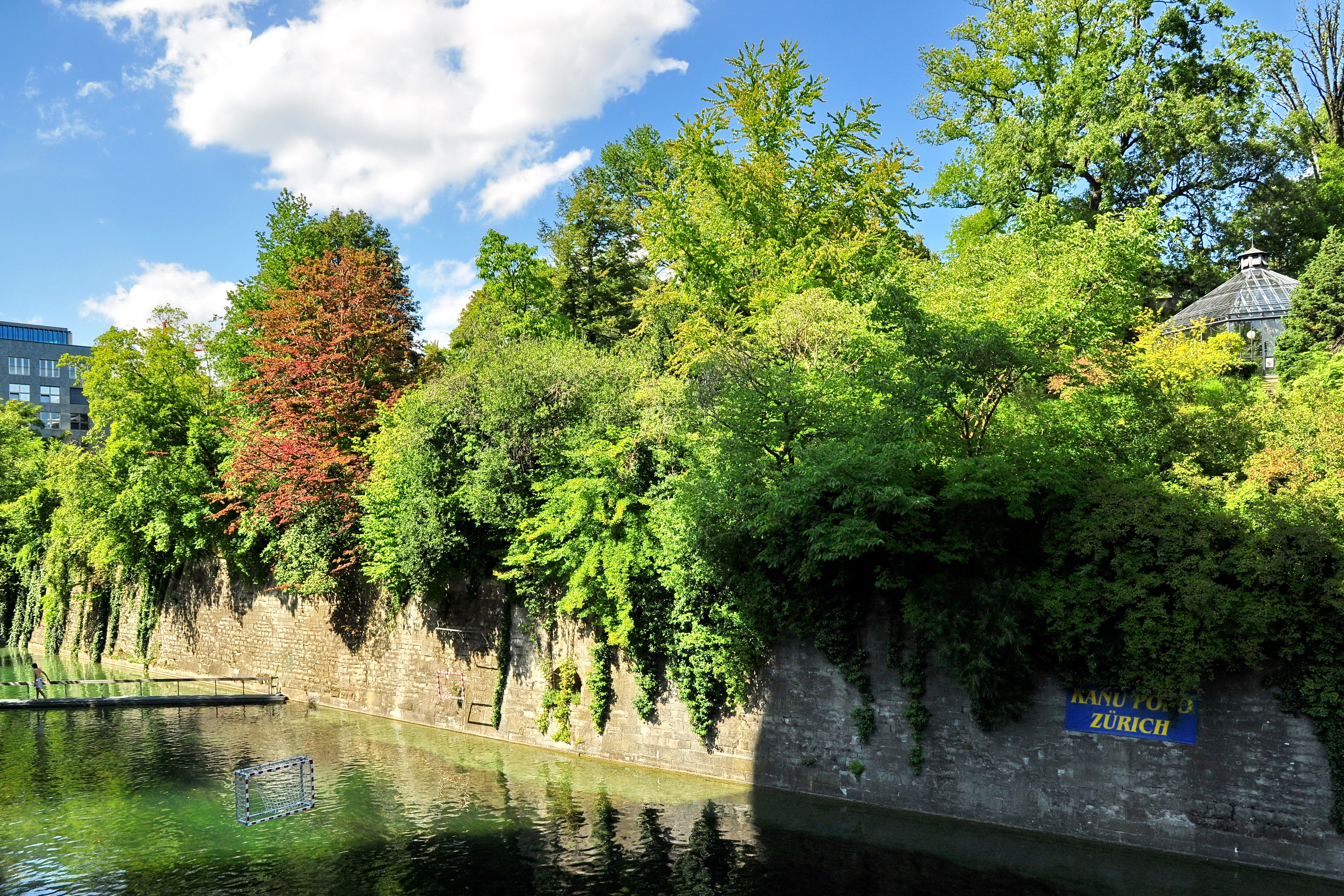
original wall at the Old Botanical Garden

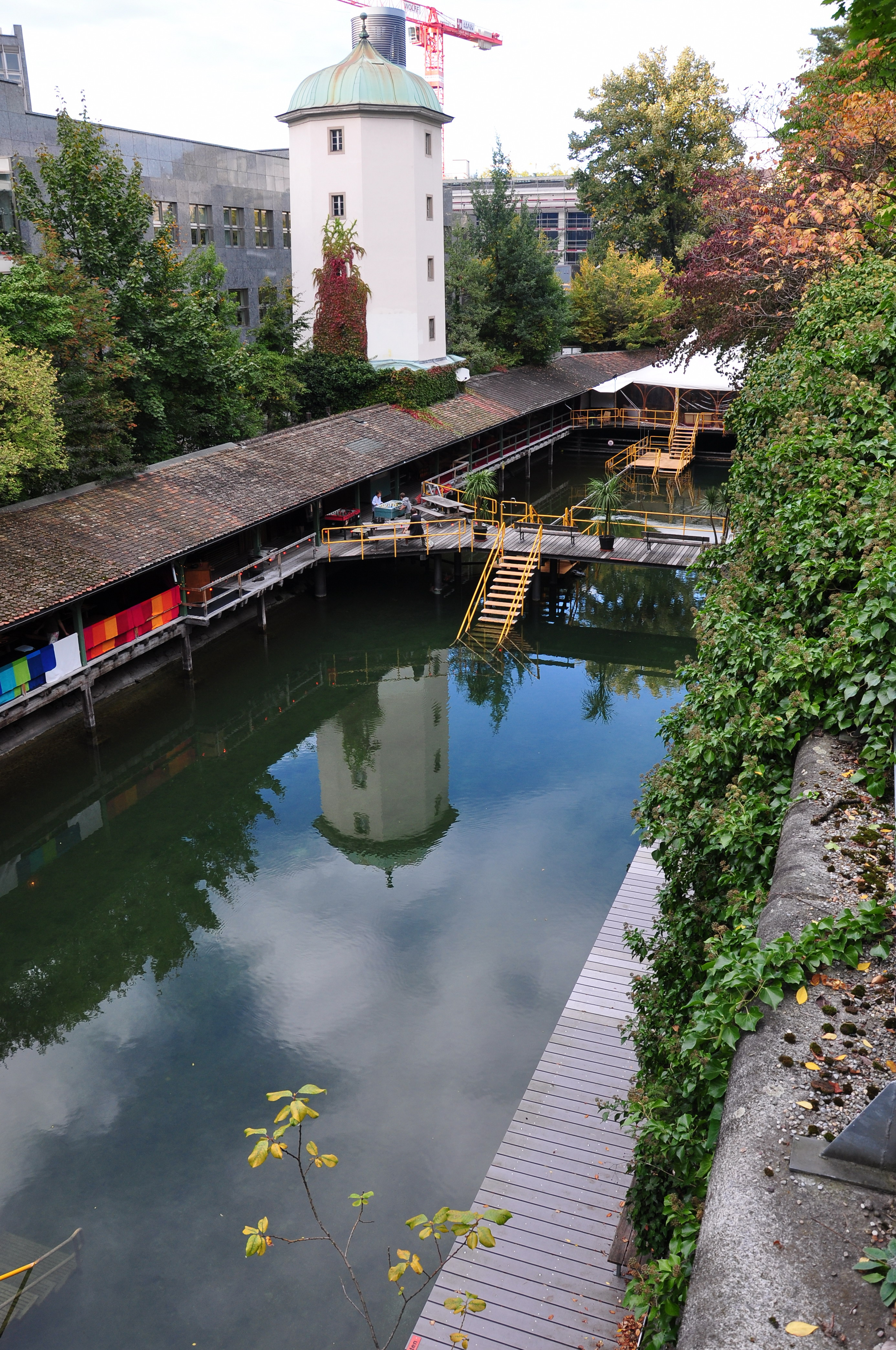
Männerbad and water tower of 1742

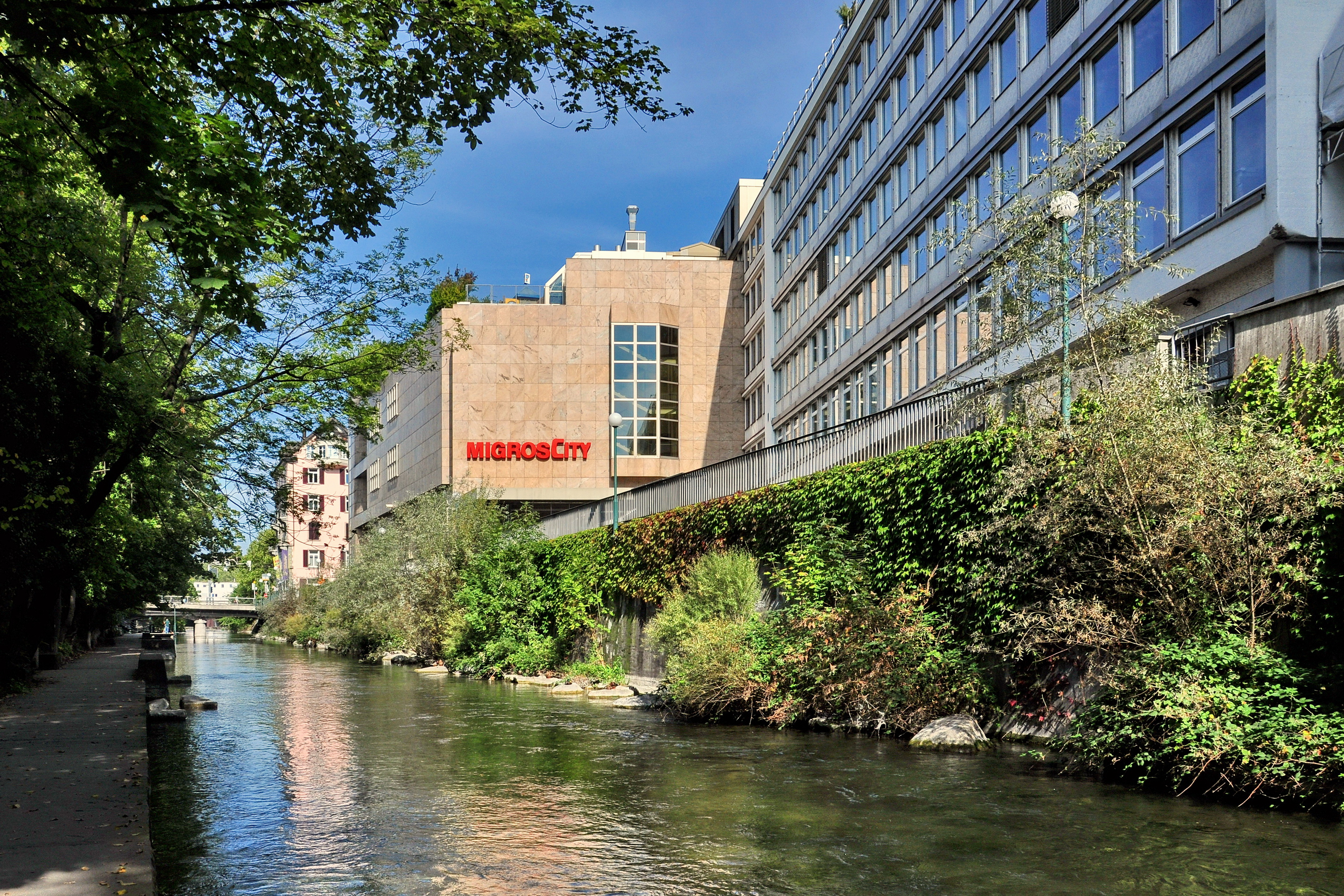
nearby Sihlporte and Gessnerallee

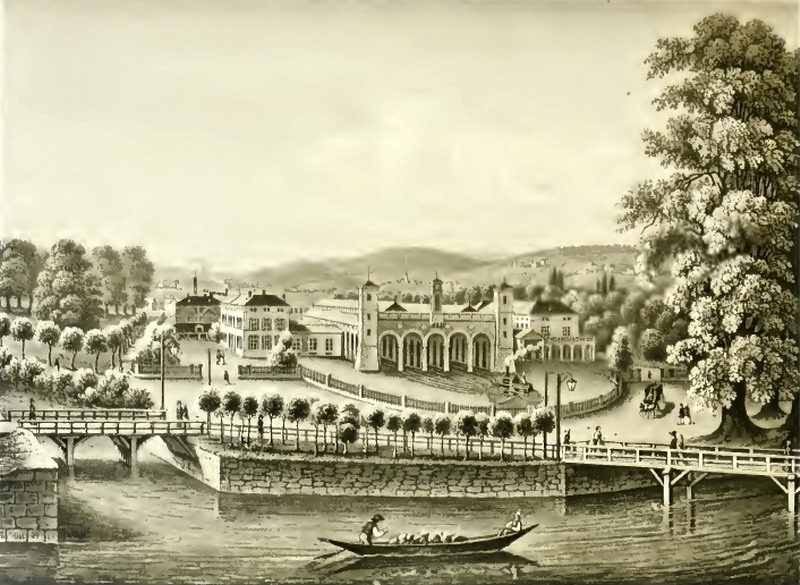
former mouth into the Limmat

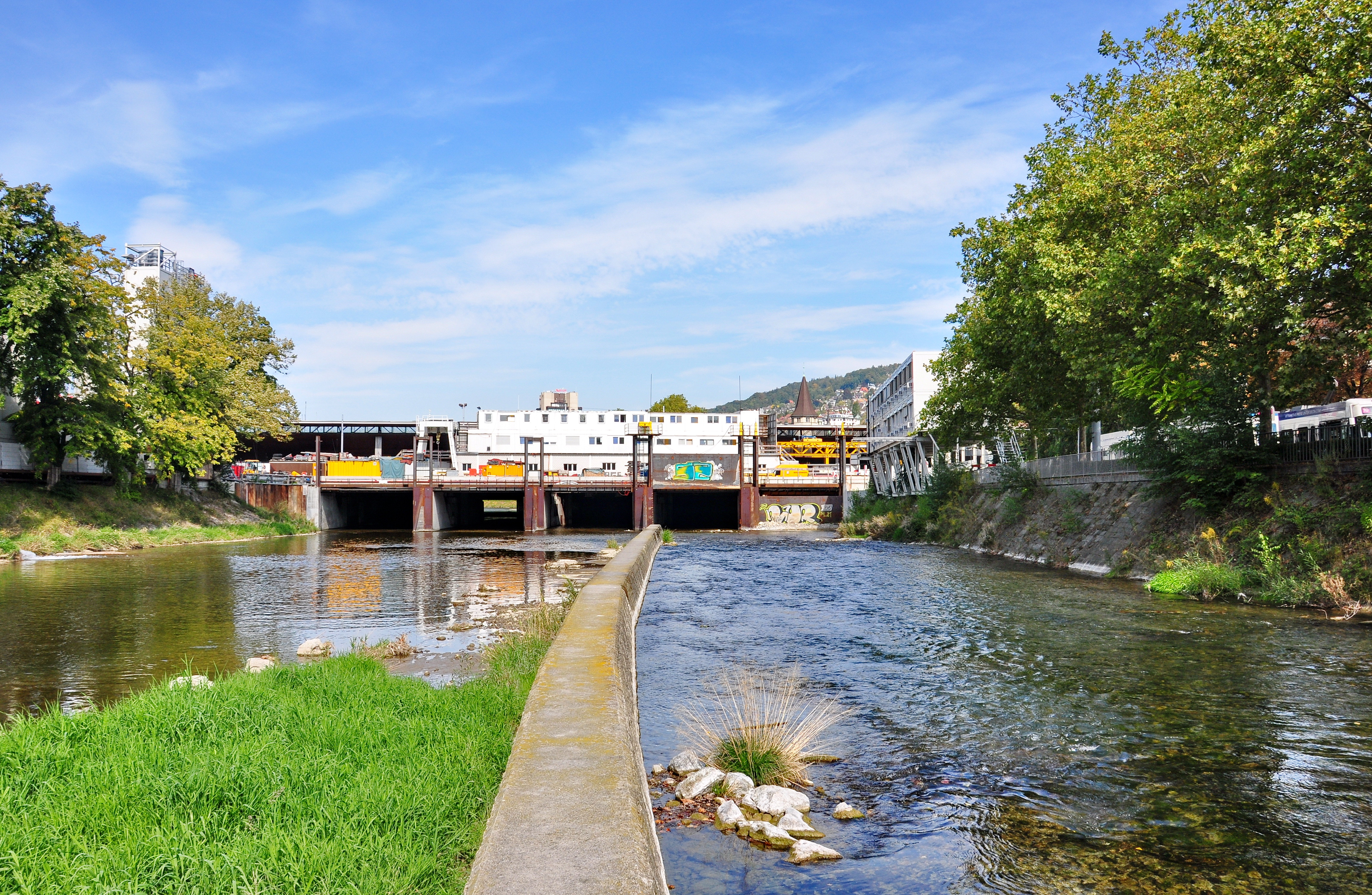
Confluence with the Sihl in 2010, near Central Station

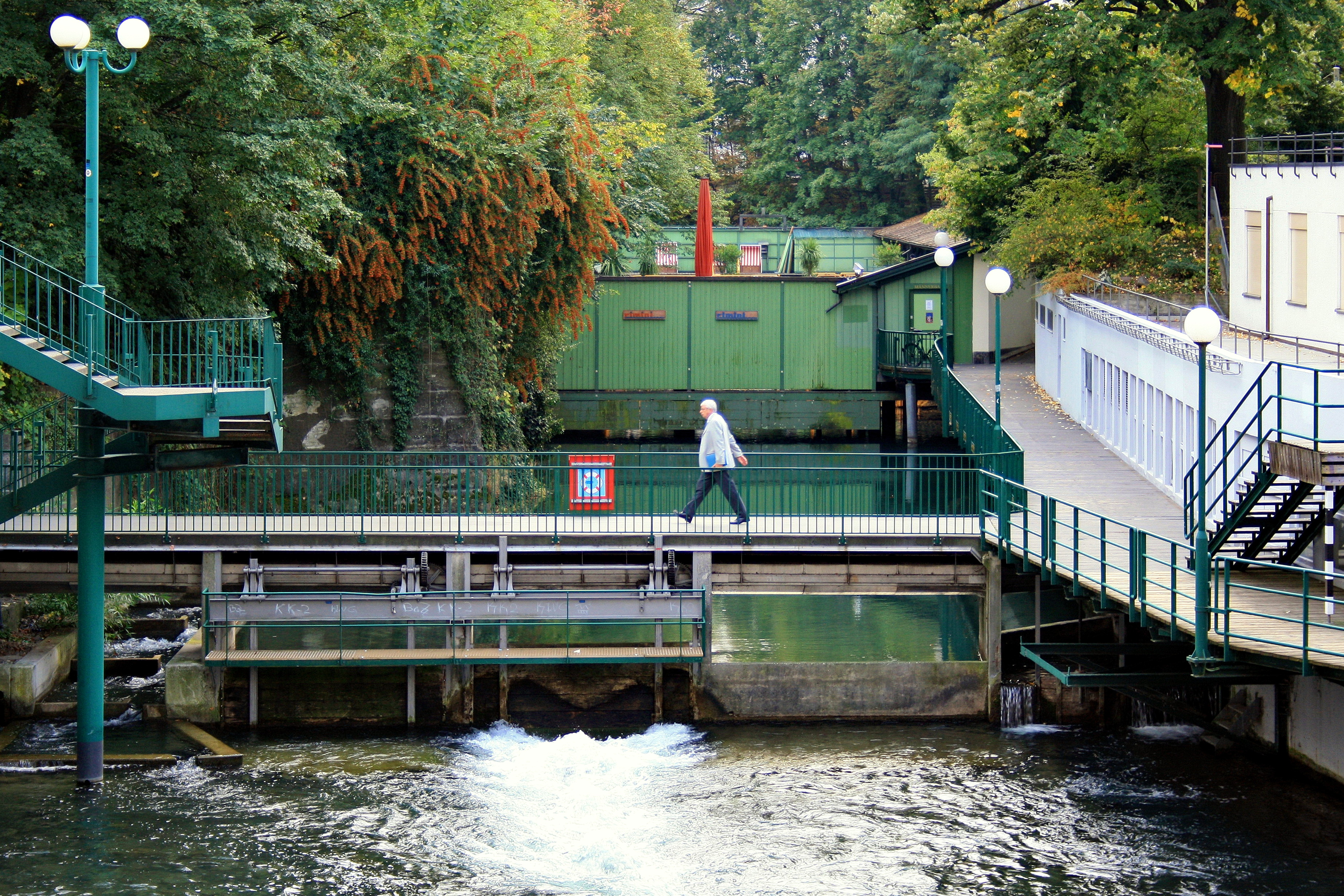
the weir at the indoor aquatic centre City, Männerbadi in the background and the site of the Old Botanical Garden to the left

As of December 2015, an association asked for a concession on an issue of water rights concession and a water protection legal permit for the installation of a water wheel purpose of power generation in the Schanzengraben moat. According to the application, at the weir near the indoor aquatic centre City estimated 3,000 liters/second drop a height of 75 centimetres (30 in) and could supply electricity for about 20 households.

== History ==
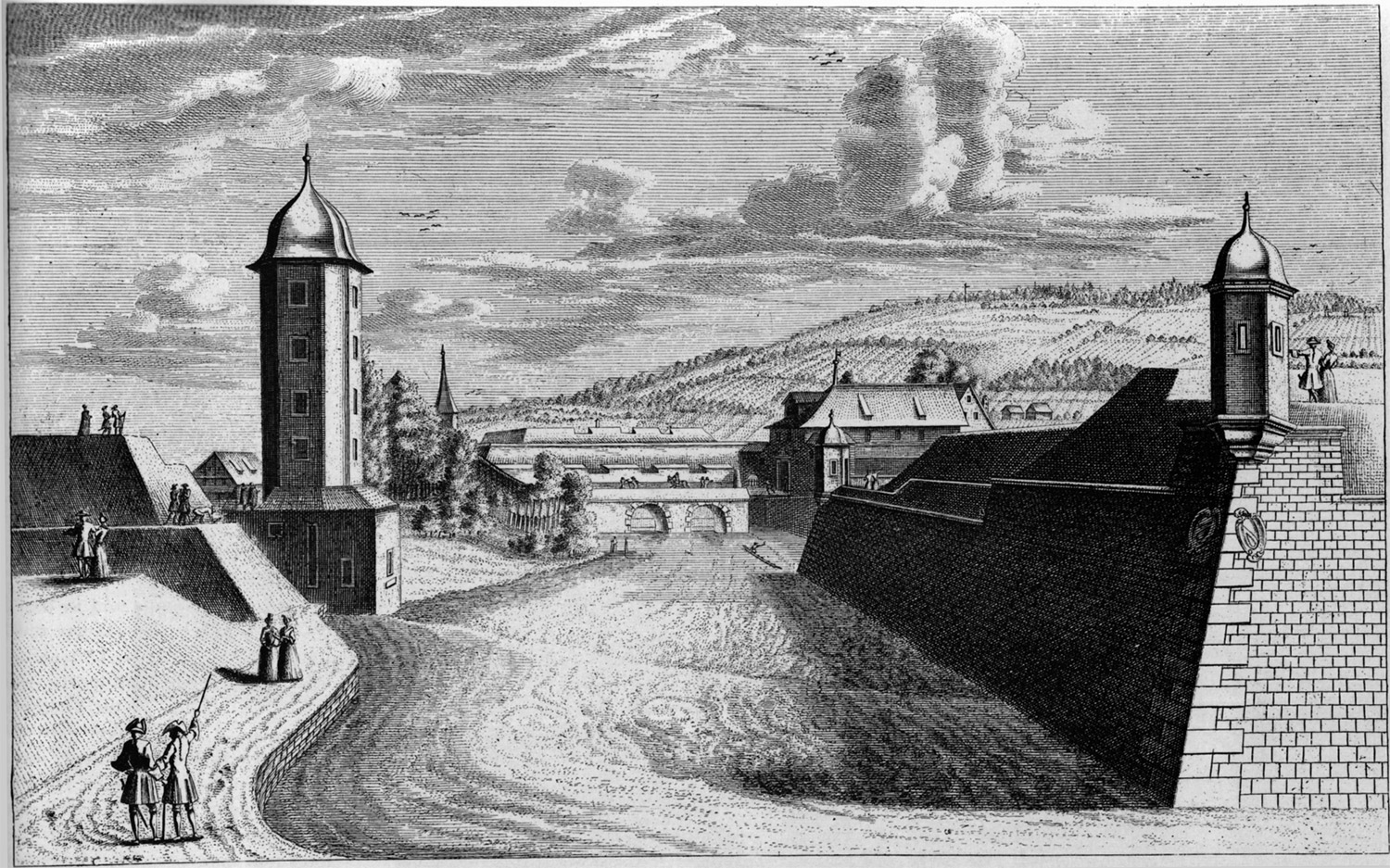
Drawing showing the Katz bulwark in the 1730s

The moat system of medieval Zurich, consisting of the internal (i.e. inside the town wall) Fröschengraben, the outer Sihlgraben and the intermediate town wall was first mentioned in 1258 AD as niuwer graben (new moat), and in 1293 as graben ze Woloshofen Türlin, probably meaning the moat at the Wollishofen gate. The present Schanzengraben was still in construction around 1300. On the wall gardens, probably the area between Fröschengraben, Sihlgraben and Schanzengraben, a house is mentioned in 1346, and in 1537 the area of the outer trench was named Sprachhüsli, meaning a public toilet. Over the decades, the time accumulating sludge was periodically dug out by day laborers or in forced labor to process. The excavation was used to fertilize the fields of the Oetenbach nunnery.

Due to its former military defensive use, the moat has a widely octagonal zig-zag form, and was completed as part of the Baroque fortifications of Zurich around 1642 AD. Being once the moat outside the town wall, the bulwark "Zur Katz" was the former easterly gunnery bastion of the city fortification. In 1830 the moat was redesigned as the second effluence of Lake Zurich, then redirected to the Sihl, and therefore it 'survived' the demolition of the Baroque fortification system.

Männerbad Schanzengraben was built in 1864, as a logical 'counterpart' to the Frauenbad at the Stadthausquai, being the historical men's bath. During the industrialization, on the node's banks settled various factories, and so Schanzengraben degenerated over time to an unattractive factory channel. The water tower, a local landmark, was built in 1724, and still exists in its original construction. First discussed in 1952, the reconstruction of the moat in a pedestrian promenade was not done until 1975, however, the construction works ended in 1984.

== Cultural Heritage ==
The Schanzengraben moat is listed in the inventory of estimable gardens and grounds of local importance. It also is listed in the Swiss inventory of cultural property of national and regional significance as an object of regional relevance.

== See also ==
- Bürkliplatz
- Old Botanical Garden, Zürich
- Quaianlagen

== Literature ==
- Dölf Wild: Stadtmauern. Ein neues Bild der Stadtbefestigungen Zürichs (= Stadtgeschichte und Städtebau in Zürich. Schriften zu Archäologie, Denkmalpflege und Stadtplanung. 5). Schrift zur Ausstellung im Haus zum Haus zum Rech, Zürich, 6. Februar bis 30. April 2004. Amt für Städtebau, Baugeschichtliches Archiv, Zürich 2004, ISBN 3-905384-05-1.
- Christine Barraud Wiener and Peter Jezler: Die Stadt Zürich I. Stadt vor der Mauer, mittelalterliche Befestigung und Limmatraum. In: Die Kunstdenkmäler des Kantons Zürich, Wiese Verlag, Basel 1999, ISBN 978-3-9061-3171-9.
