= Botany (disambiguation) =

Botany is the scientific study of plant life.

Botany may also refer to:

== Places ==
=== New Zealand ===
- Botany (New Zealand electorate), a New Zealand Parliamentary electoral district
- Botany, New Zealand, a suburb in Auckland, New Zealand
- Botany Town Centre, a shopping precinct in the Auckland, New Zealand suburb

=== Elsewhere ===
- Botany, New South Wales, a suburb of Sydney, Australia
- Boťany, a village in Slovakia

== Arts, entertainment, and media ==
- Botany (journal), a scientific journal
- Botany Boyz, a rap crew from Houston, United States

== Other uses ==
- Botany 500, a manufacturer of men's clothing

== See also ==
- Botanic (disambiguation)
- Botanica (disambiguation)
- Botanical
- Botanique (disambiguation)
- Botanist (band), a black metal project
- The Botanist, gin brand
- Botany Bay (disambiguation)
- Plant Biology (journal)
- Plant Science (journal)
