= Botanical garden (disambiguation) =

A botanical garden or botanic garden is a particular kind of formal garden, usually with a scientific or educational purpose.

Botanical Garden may also refer to:

== Botanical gardens ==
- National Botanical Garden (disambiguation)
- Royal Botanic Gardens (disambiguation)
- Old Botanical Garden, Zurich, dating from 1746
- Botanical Garden of the University of Zurich, opened in 1977
- List of botanical gardens

== Books ==
- The Botanic Garden, a book published by Erasmus Darwin, Charles Darwin's grandfather

== Transport ==
- Botanic Garden (BMT Franklin Avenue Line), a New York Subway station
- Botanic Gardens MRT station, Singapore
- Botanic railway station, Belfast, Northern Ireland
- Botanical Garden metro station, a metro station in Delhi, India
- China National Botanical Garden station, light rail station in Beijing, China
- Botanical Garden station (Chengdu Metro), metro station in Chengdu, China
- Botanical Garden station (Guangzhou Metro), metro station in Guangzhou, China
- Botanical Garden (Metro-North station), a commuter station in the Bronx, New York
- Botanic Gardens railway station, a disused station in Glasgow, Scotland
- Hull Botanic Gardens railway station, a disused station in Hull, England
- Taipei Botanical Garden metro station, a constructing metro station in Taipei, Taiwan

== See also ==
- Botanique (disambiguation)
