= Botanic =

Botanic is an adjective related to botany, the study of plants.

Botanic may also refer to:

- Botanic (District Electoral Area), an electoral ward of Belfast, Northern Ireland, named after Belfast's Botanic Gardens
  - Botanic railway station, serving this area of Belfast
- Botanic (company), a French gardening supply retail chain

== See also ==
- Botany (disambiguation)
- Botanique (disambiguation)
- Botanical garden (disambiguation)
