= Anne Bruneau =

Canadian biologist

- Scientific career
- Fields: Biology
- Workplaces: Université de Montréal, Montreal

Anne Bruneau is a Canadian biologist and professor at the Université de Montréal, and is the first woman to hold the position of director of the Institute for Research in Plant Biology at that university.

== Biography ==
Bruneau obtained a bachelor's degree from McGill University in Montreal in 1982, and a master's from the University of Connecticut in plant sciences in 1986. For her PhD at Cornell University in 1993, she worked on plant systematics. In 1995, she did a postdoc at the University of Reading in England. That same year, she joined the Department of Biological Sciences at the University of Montreal as a professor. She has directed the Plant Biology Research Institute there, and since 2011, she has been the scientific director of the Centre for Biodiversity at the Université de Montréal.

Bruneau is the first woman to position of director of the Institute for Research in Plant Biology at the Université de Montréal.

== Research ==
Bruneau's primary field of research involves legume plants.

== Awards and honors ==
Annea afzelii and Annea laxiflora, plants in the Annea genus were named after Bruneau by colleagues.

In 2025, Bruneau received the title of Professor Emeritus from the Université de Montréal.

== Publications ==
- Bruneau, A. & C.E. Hughes. 2019. Tribute to Gwilym P. Lewis. Advances in Legume Systematics 13. Australian Systematic Botany 32: iv-vi. doi:10.1071/SBv32n6_TB
- Bruneau, A., L. Borges, R. Allkin, A.E. Egan, M. de la Estrella, F. Javadi, Firouzeh, B. Klitgaard, J. Miller, D. Murphy, C. Sinou, M. Vantaparast & R. Zhang. 2019. Towards a new online species information system for legumes. Advances in Legume Systematics 13. Australian Systematic Botany 32: 495-518. doi:10.1071/SB19025
- Koenen, E., D. Ojeda Alayon, R. Steeves, J. Migliore, F.T. Bakker, J. Wieringa, C. Kidner, O. Hardy, R.T. Pennington, A. Bruneau & C.E. Hughes. 2019. Large-scale genomic sequence data resolve the deepest divergences in the legume phylogeny and support a near-simultaneous evolutionary origin of all six subfamilies. New Phytologist, accepted. doi:10.1111/nph.16290
- Azani, N., A. Bruneau, M.F. Wojciechowski & S. Zarre. 2019. Miocene climate change as a driving force for multiple origins of annual species in Astragalus (Fabaceae, Papilionoideae). Molecular Phylogenetics and Evolution 137: 210-221. doi:10.1016/j.ympev.2019.05.008
- Ojeda, D.I., E. Koenen, S. Cervantes, M. de la Estrella, E. Banguera-Hinestroza, S. B. Janssens, J. Migliore, B. Demenou, A. Bruneau, F. Forest & O.J. Hardy. 2019. Phylogenomic analyses reveal an exceptionally high number of evolutionary shifts in a florally diverse clade of African legumes. Molecular Phylogenetics and Evolution 137: 156-167. doi:10.1016/j.ympev.2019.05.002
- Stai, J.S., A. Yadav, C. Sinou, A. Bruneau, J.J. Doyle, D. Fernández-Baca & S.B. Cannon. 2019. Cercis: a non-polyploid genomic relic within the generally polyploid Legume family. Frontiers in Plant Science 10: article 345. doi:10.3389/fpls.2019.00345

== See also ==
- List of biologists
