= Botanique =

Botanique, the French word for botany, may refer to:

- Botanique/Kruidtuin metro station, a metro station in Brussels
- Le Botanique, a cultural complex in Brussels opened in 1984 on the site of the Botanical Garden

== See also ==
- Botanic (disambiguation)
- Botanical garden (disambiguation)
- Botany (disambiguation)
