= Fortifications of Zurich =

Historical military structures in Switzerland

Zürich was an independent (reichsfrei) city or city-state from 1218 to 1798. The town was fortified with a city wall from the 13th to the 17th century, and with more elaborate ramparts constructed in the 17th to 18th century and mostly demolished in the 1830s to 1870s.

== First wall ==
There had been a first city wall dating to the 11th or 12th century. The existence of such an early wall had been suggested, but the mainstream view assumed that the town had been unfortified – the remains of the Roman castle at the Vicus Turicum, and a so-called Kaiserpfalz on Lindenhof hill excepted – before the 13th century, until the chance discovery of remnants of the first wall during the 1990s construction work at the central library respectively location of the Predigerkloster, the former Dominican abbey.

== Second wall ==
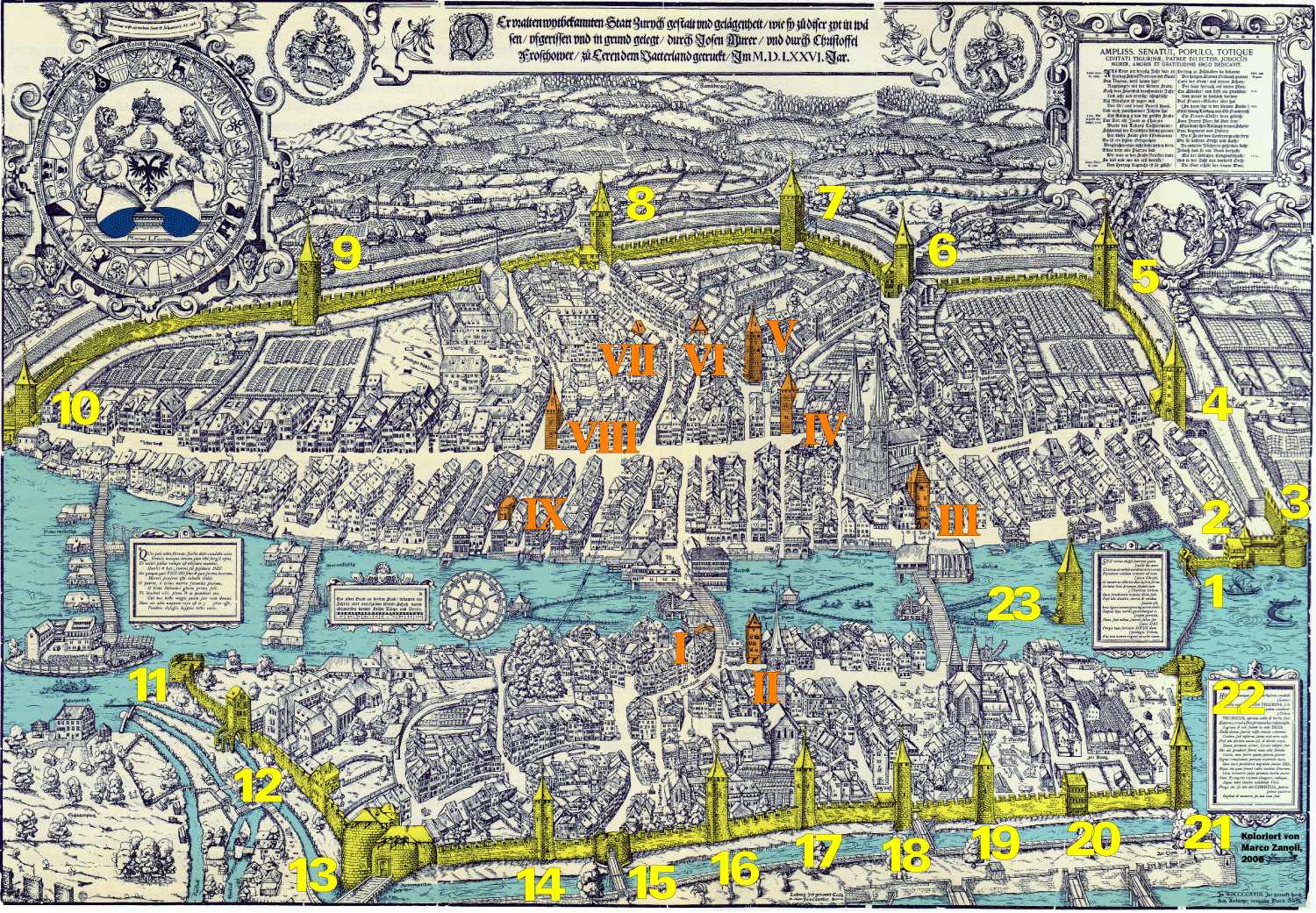
The city fortifications as shown on the 1576 Murerplan are coloured in yellow

Following the extinction of the main line of the Zähringer family in 1218, Zürich became a free imperial city. Over the following decades, a city wall was constructed over a length of some 2,400 m.

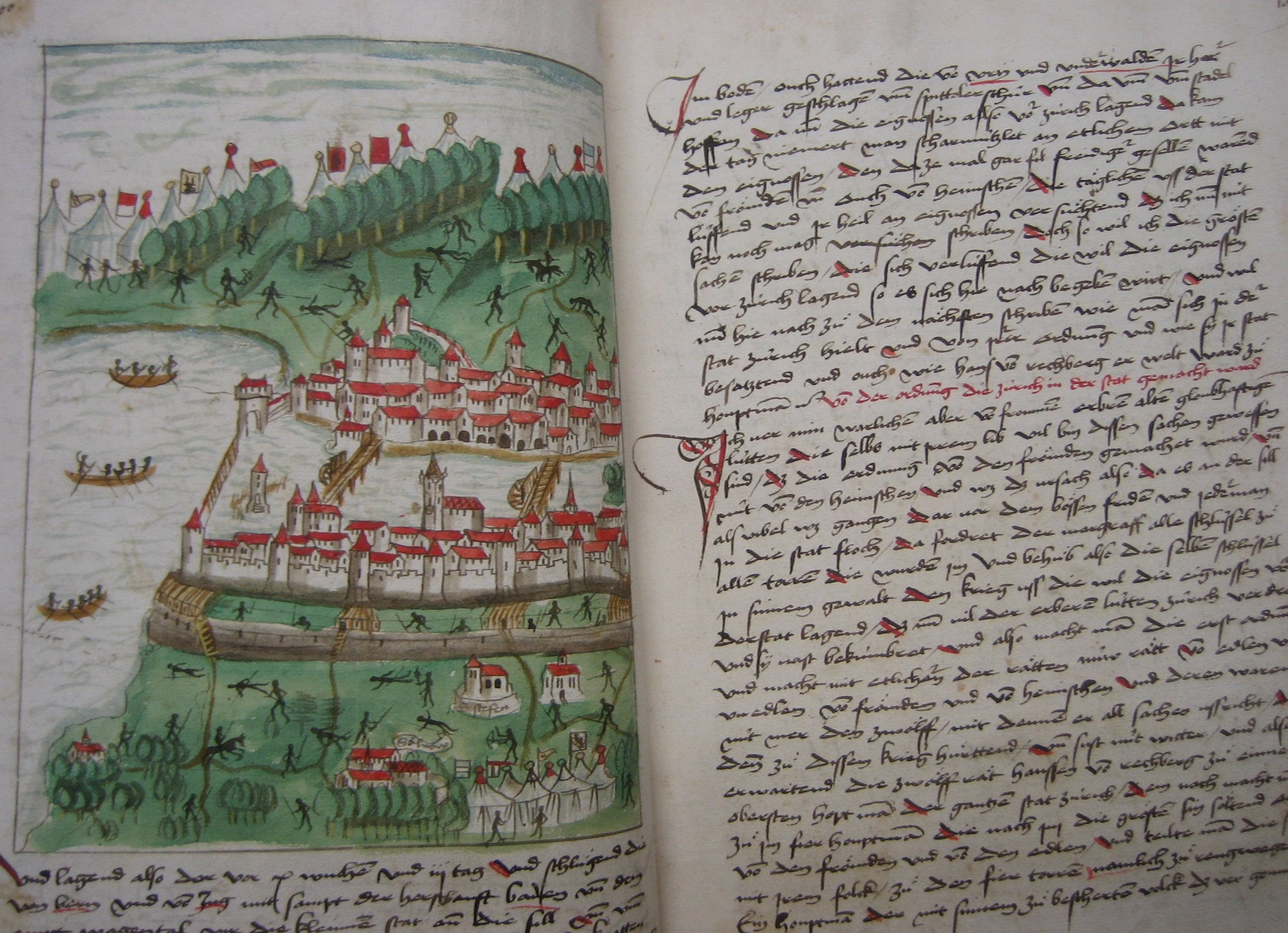
1485 depiction of the 1444 siege of Zürich during the Old Zürich War (north is right)

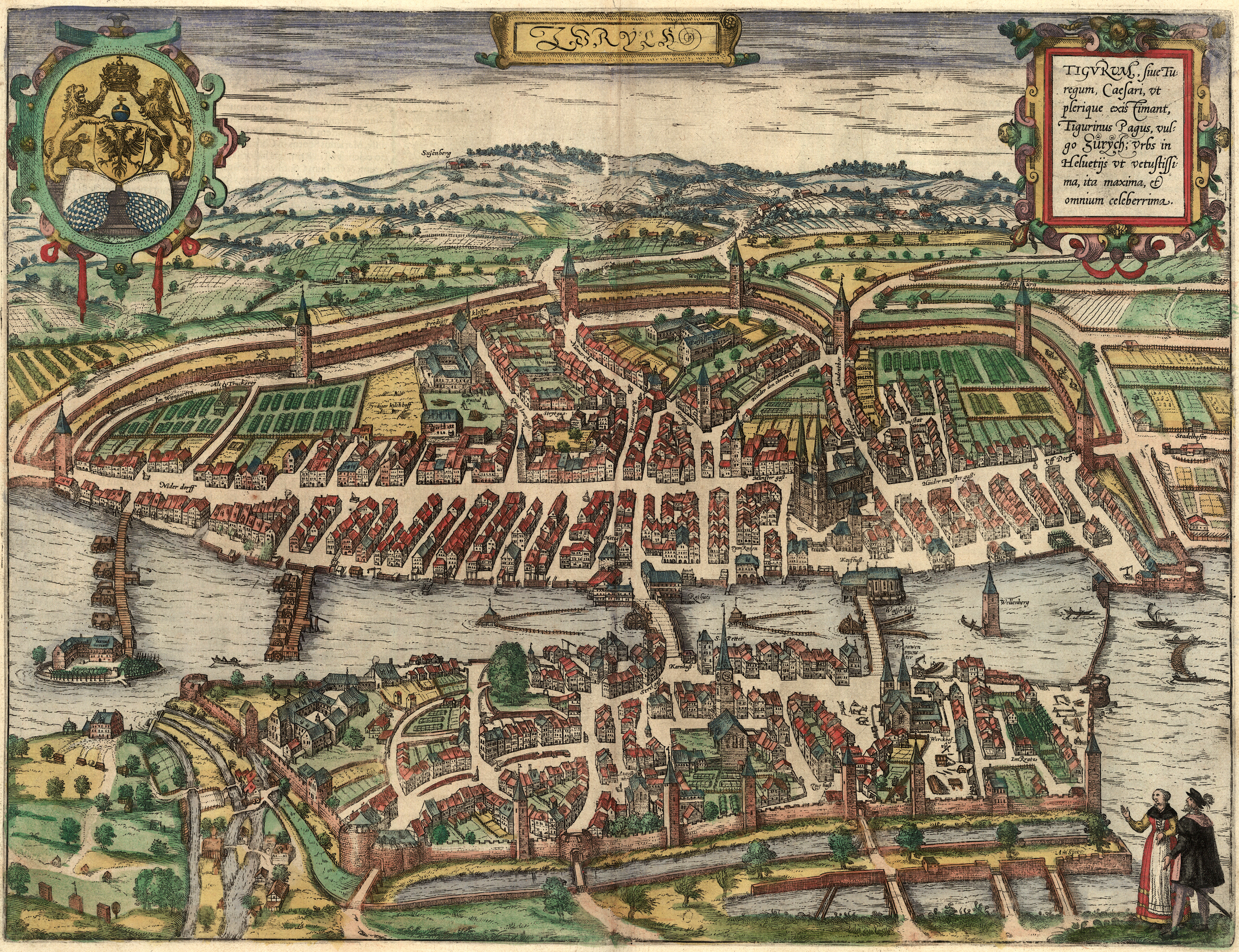
1581 depiction of Zürich (north is left)

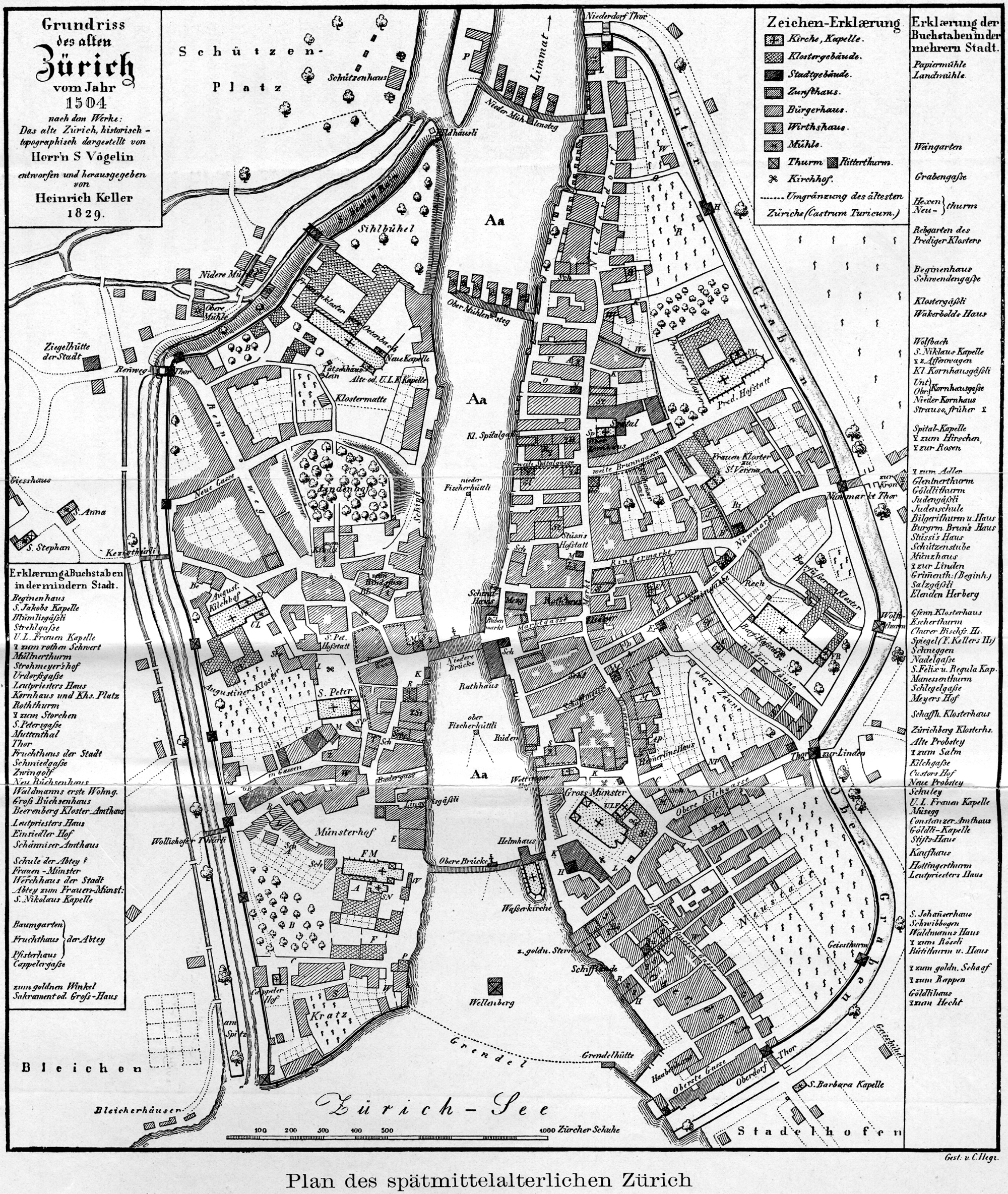
1904 map of Zürich in 1504

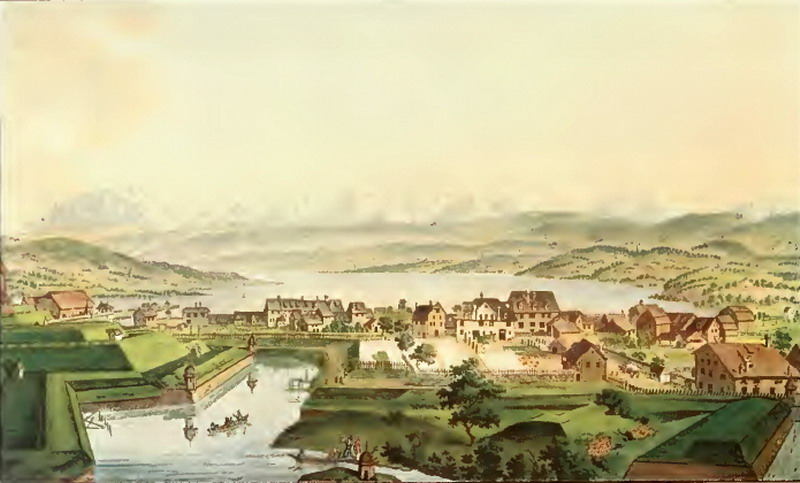
Schanzengraben, Enge quarter, Zürichsee and Albis chain, as seen from the «zur Katz» ramparts (as of today the "old" Botanical Garden)

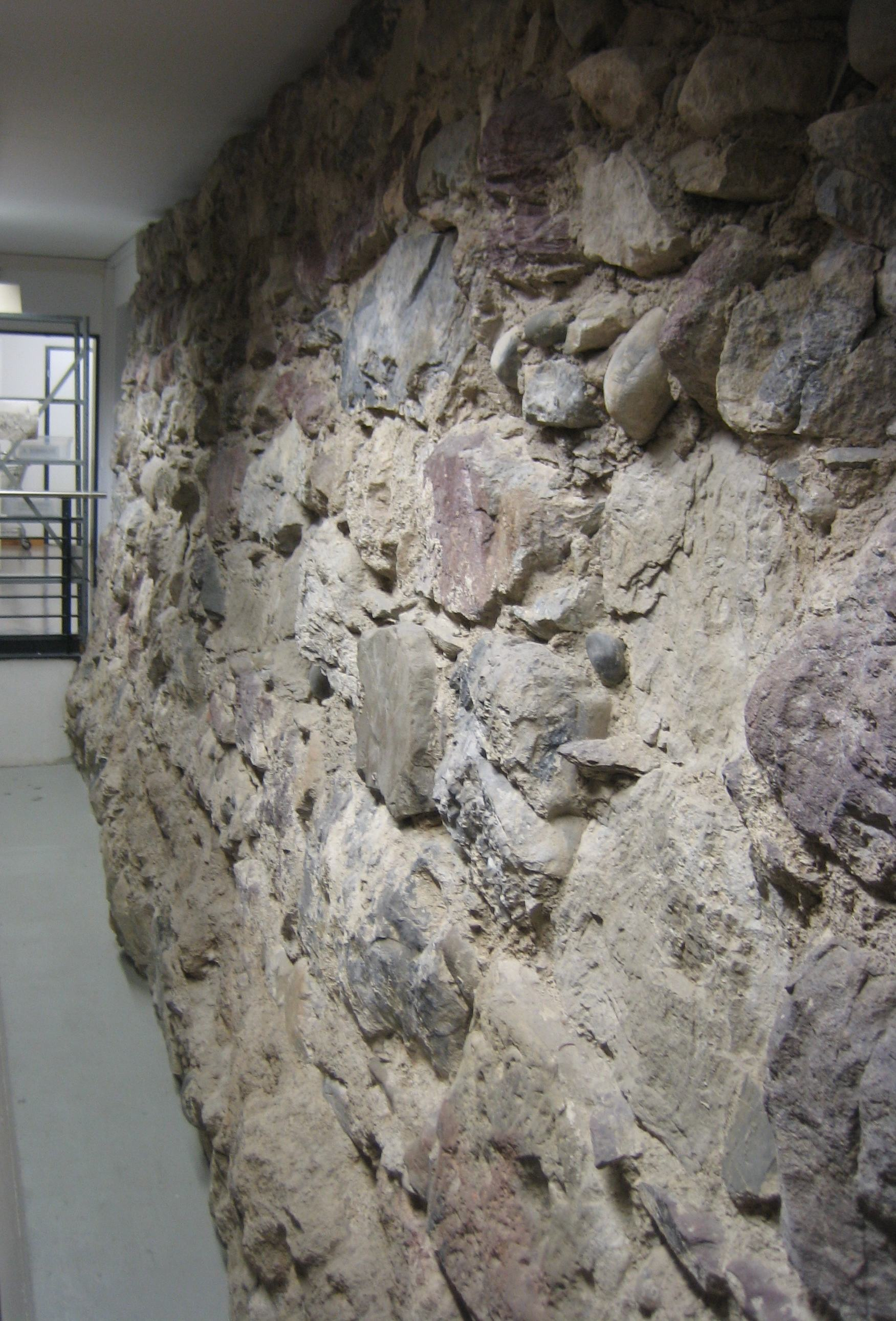
Remains of the medieval city walls in a basement of Zentralbibliothek Zürich respectively at the location of today's Predigerkirche

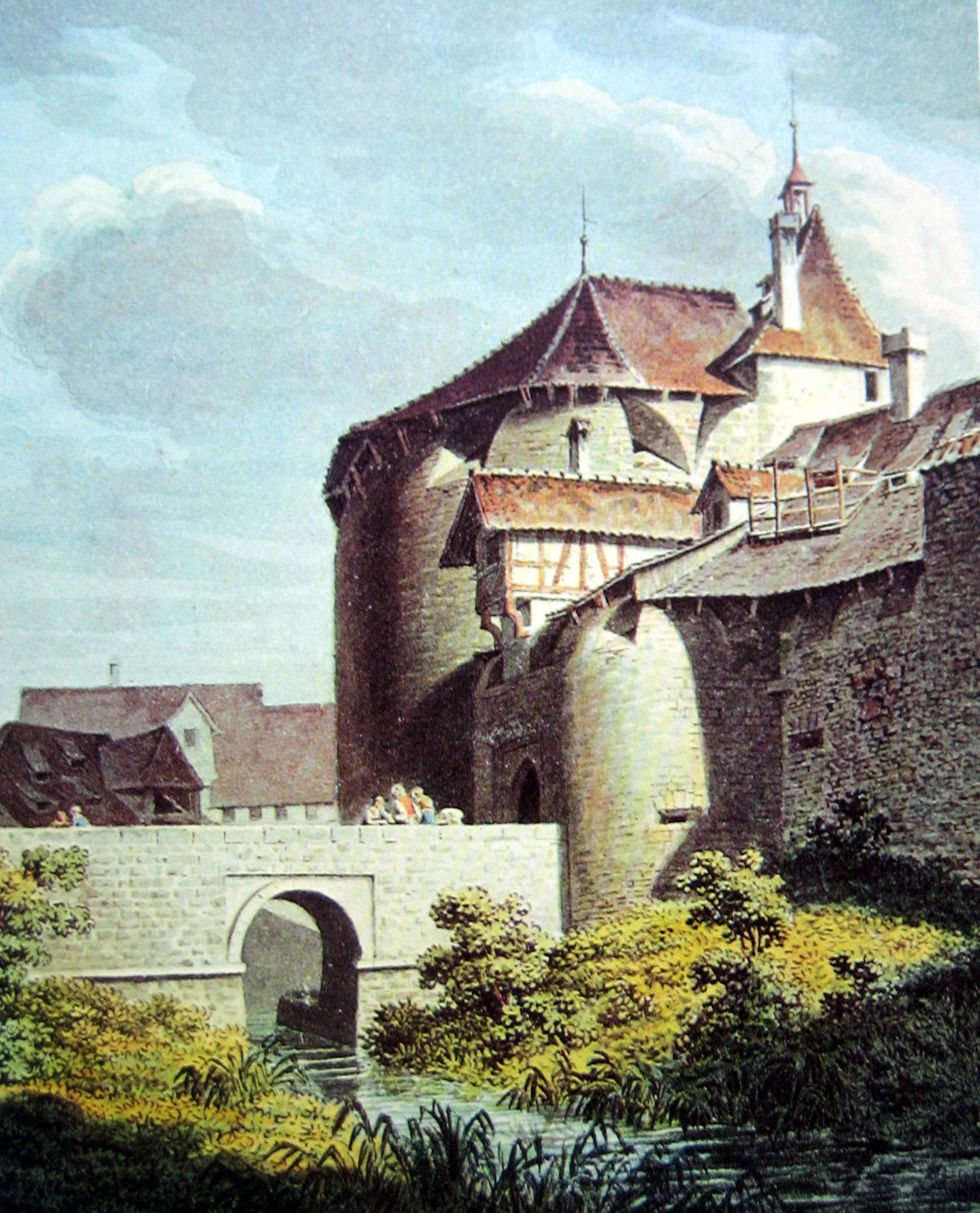
The Rennweg gate in 1812

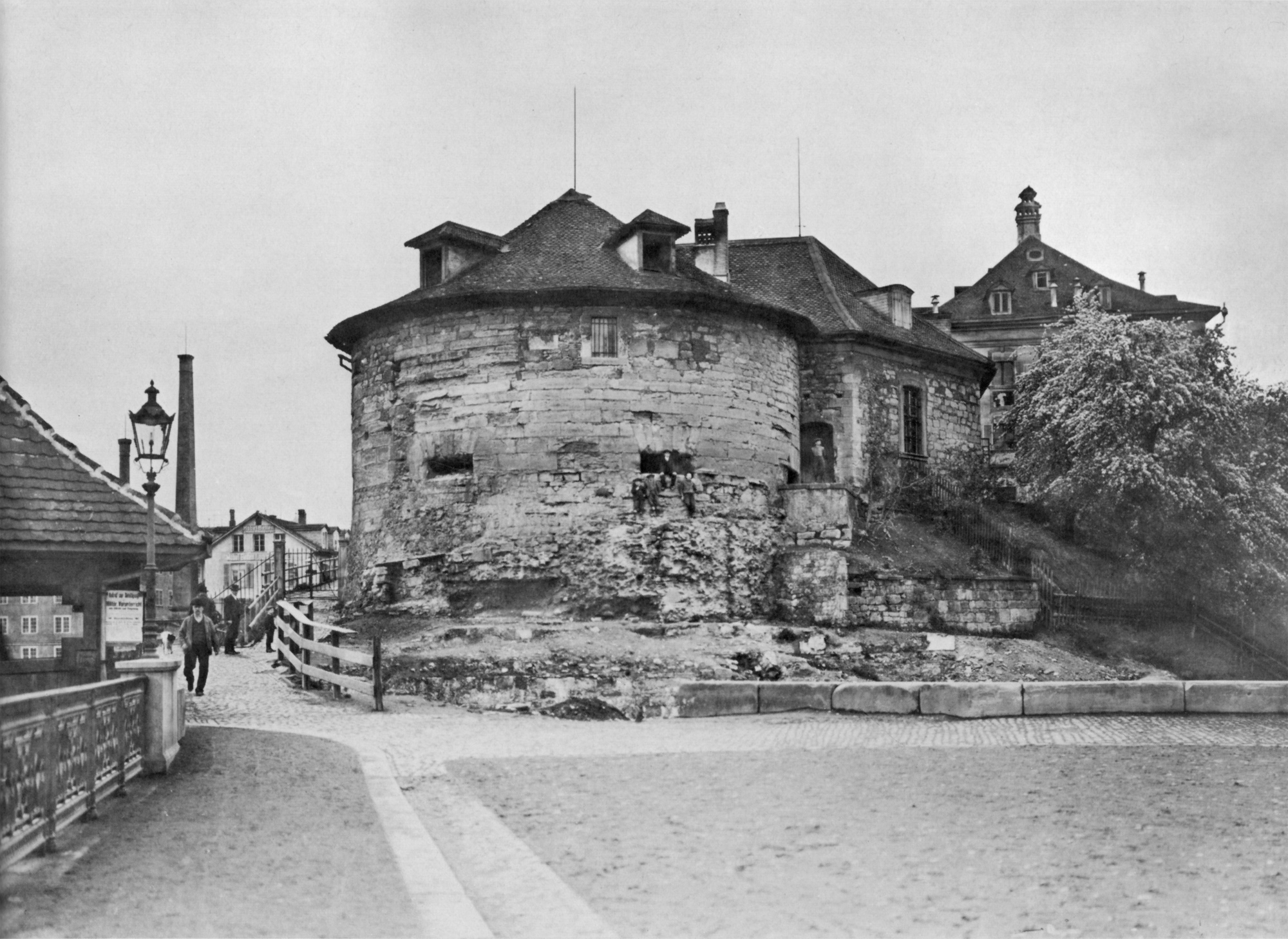
The Oetenbach bulwark (built 1532) just before its demolition in 1903

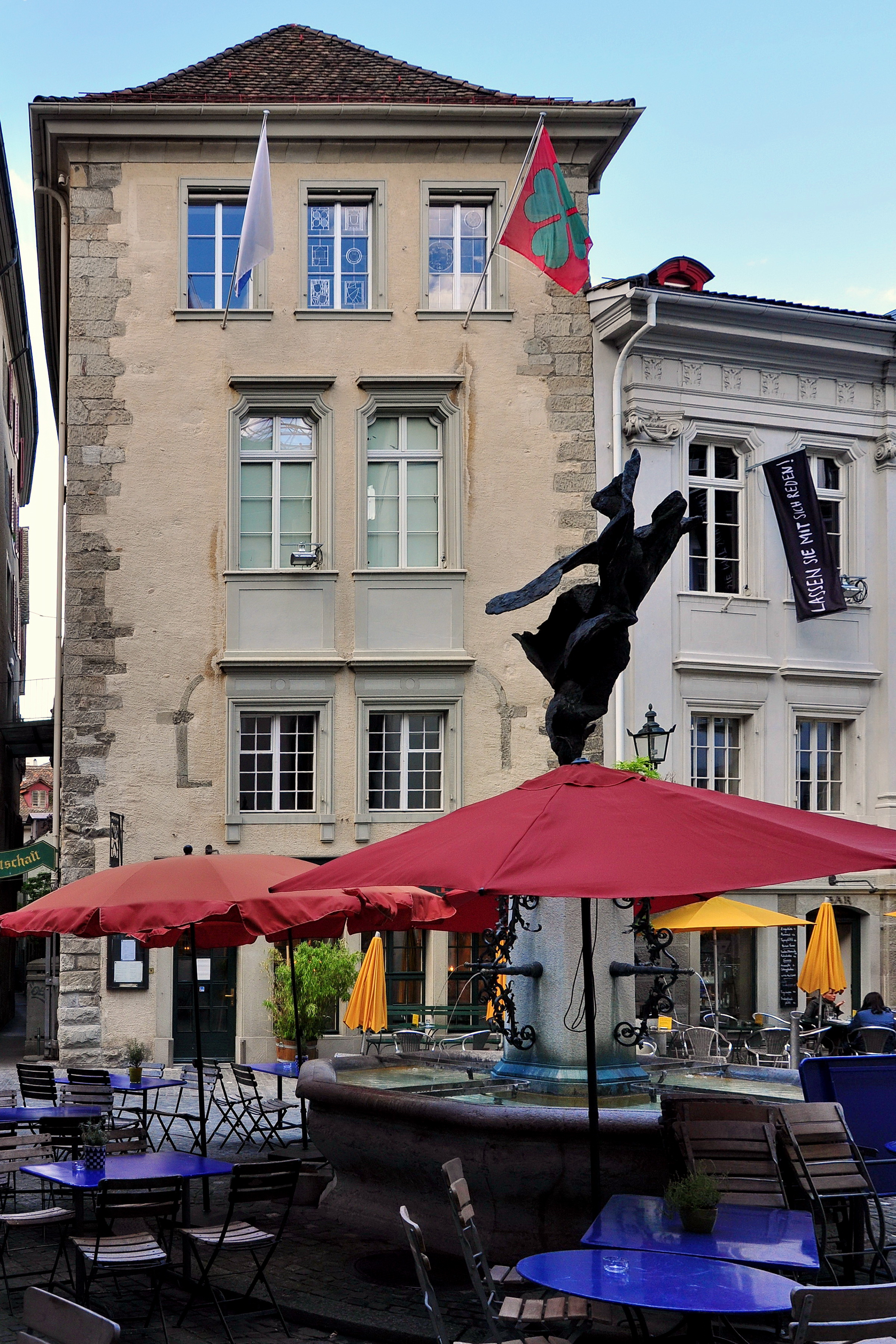
Bilgeri tower at Neumarkt

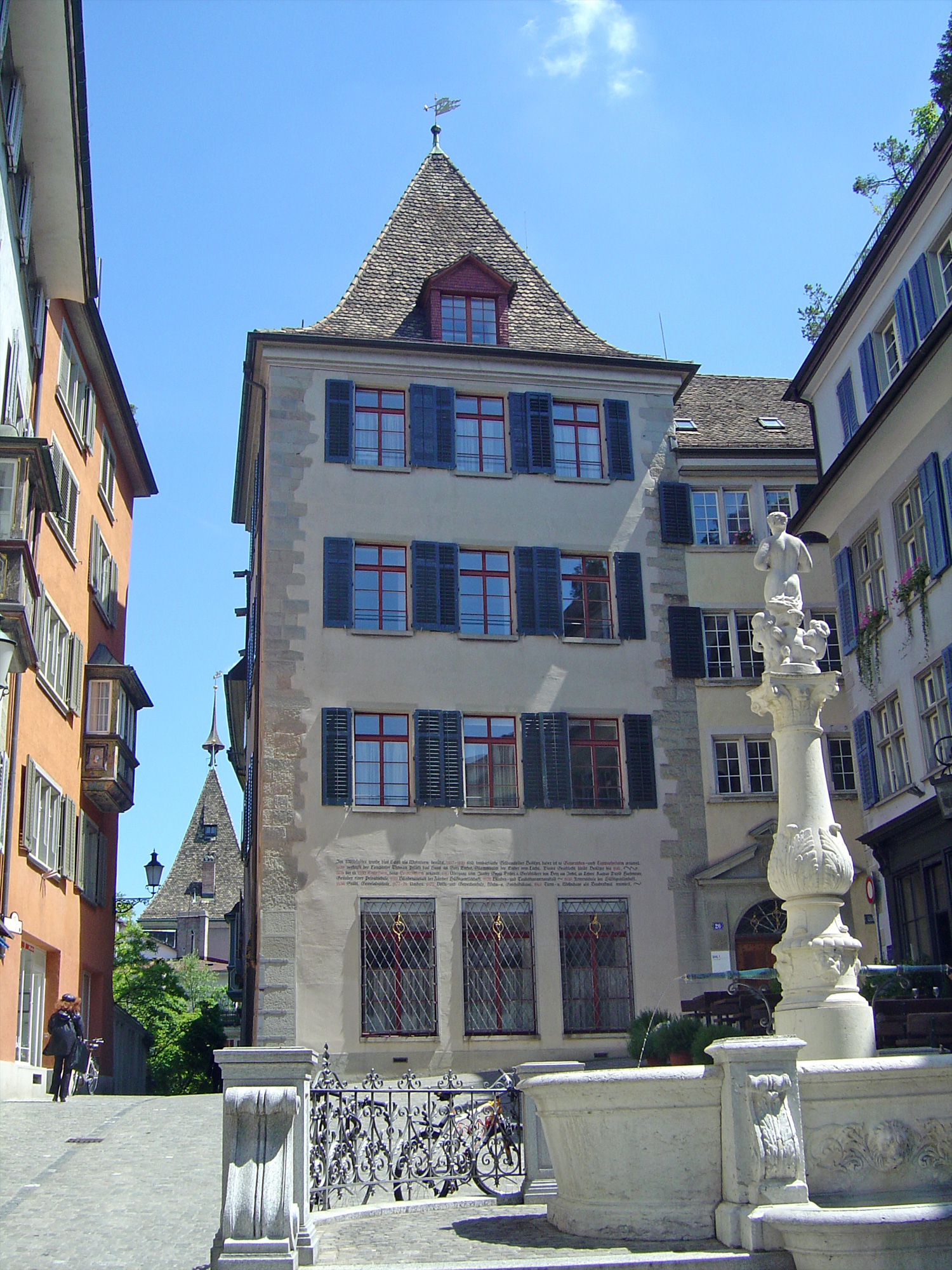
Brunnenturm (fountain tower) near Niederdorf

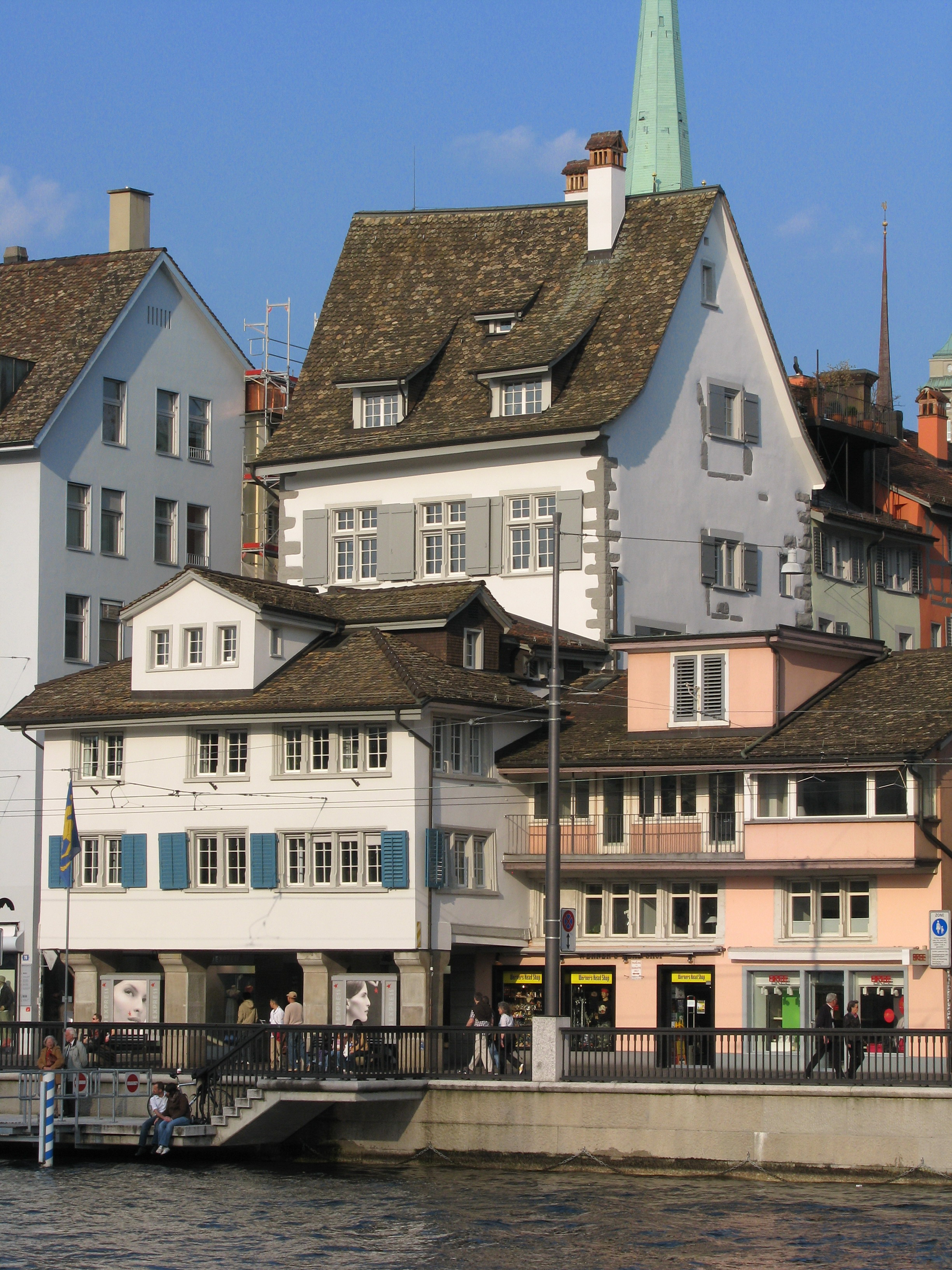
Glentner tower at Limmatquai

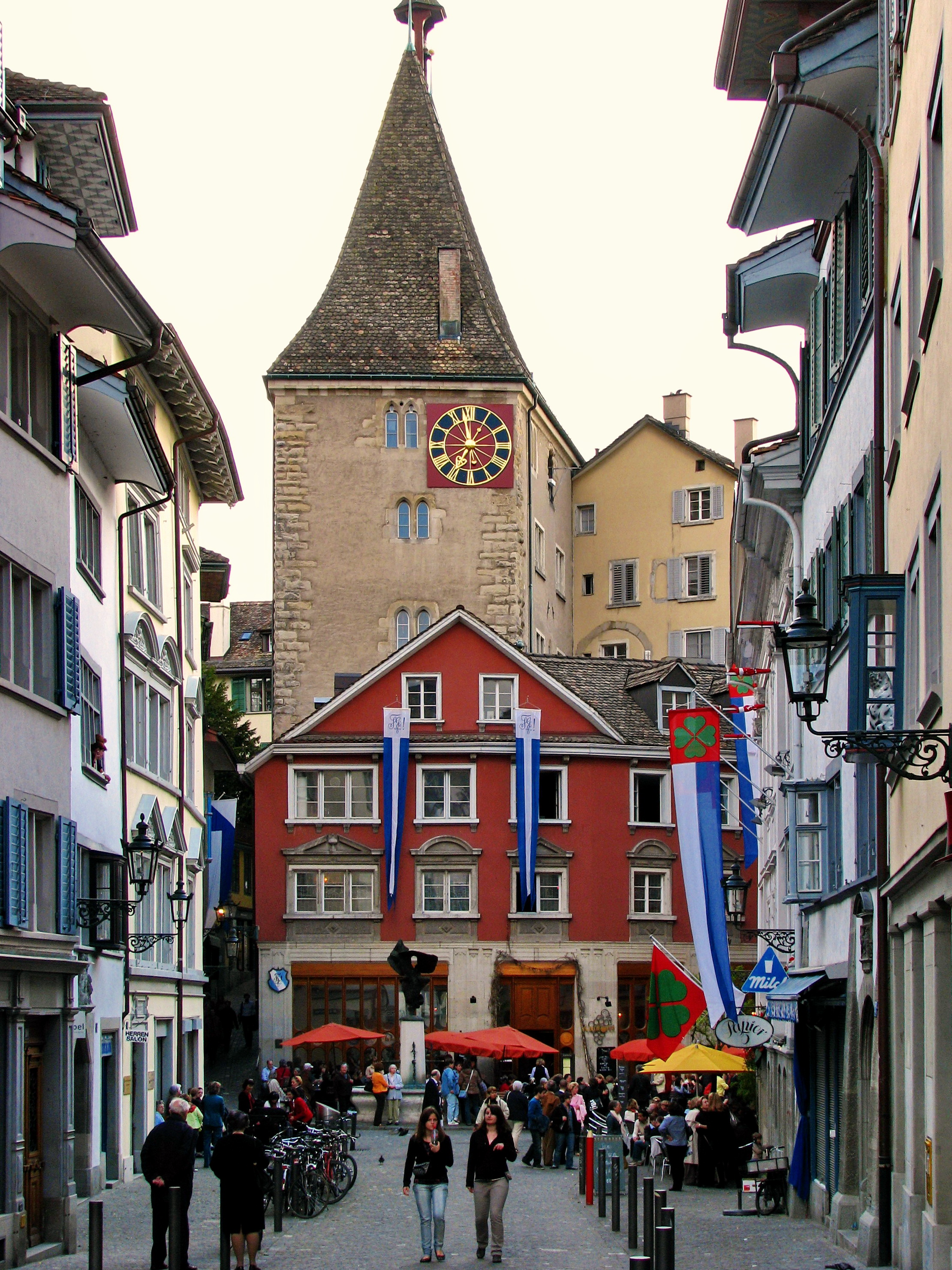
Grimmenturm at Neumarkt

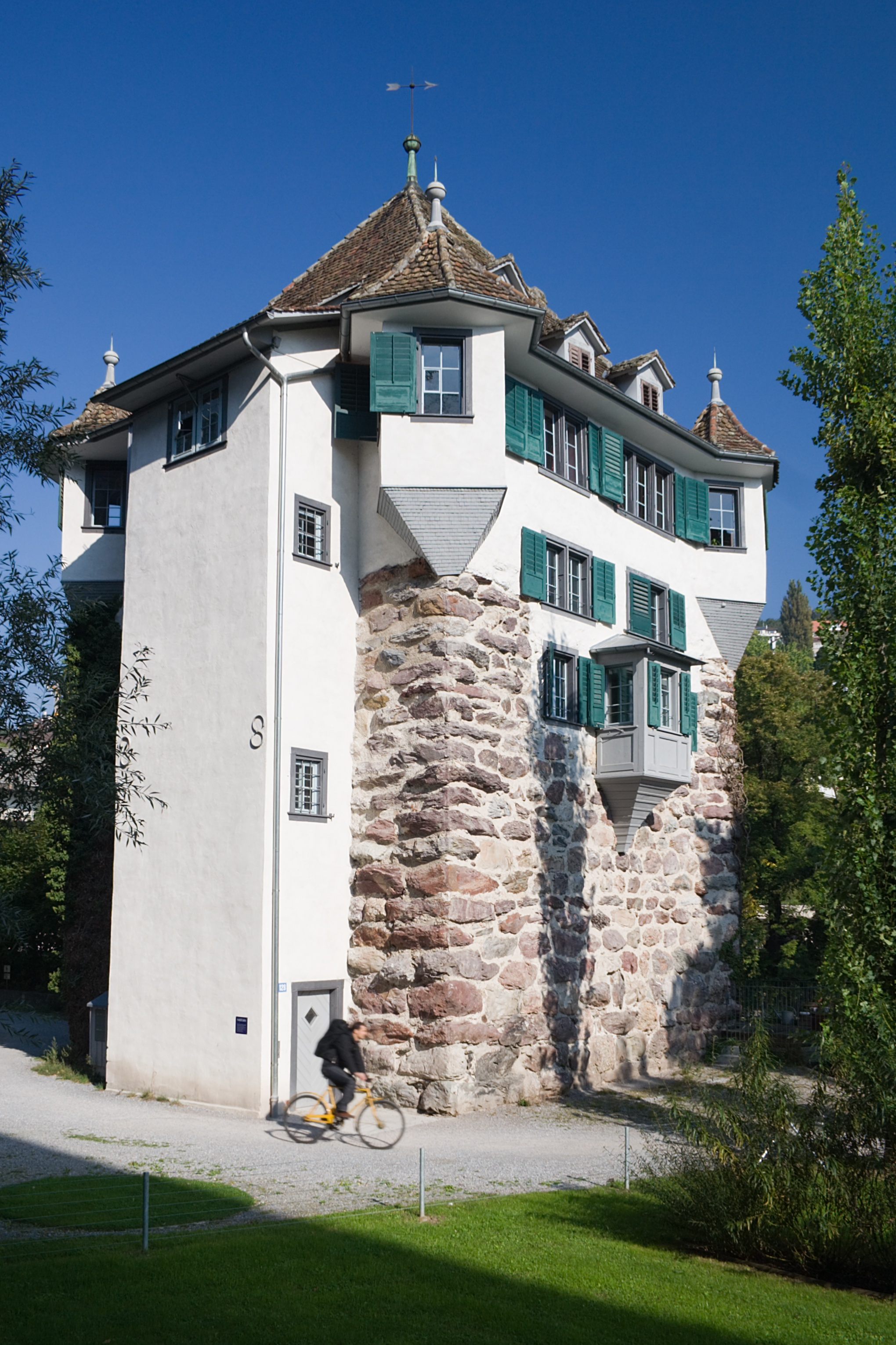
Hardturm next to the Limmat (Industriequartier)

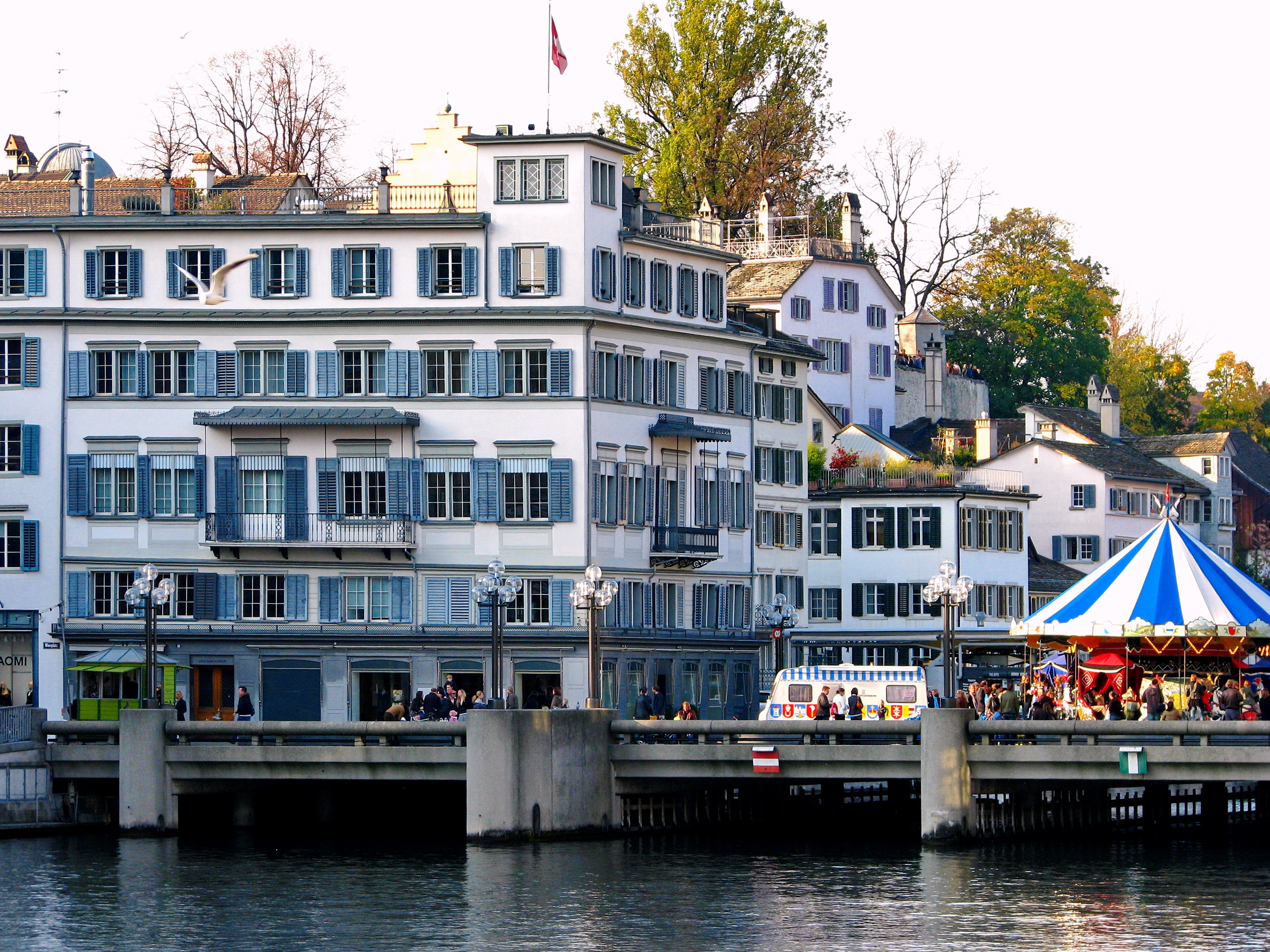
Mülnerturm or Schwert house at Weinplatz (Rathausbrücke)

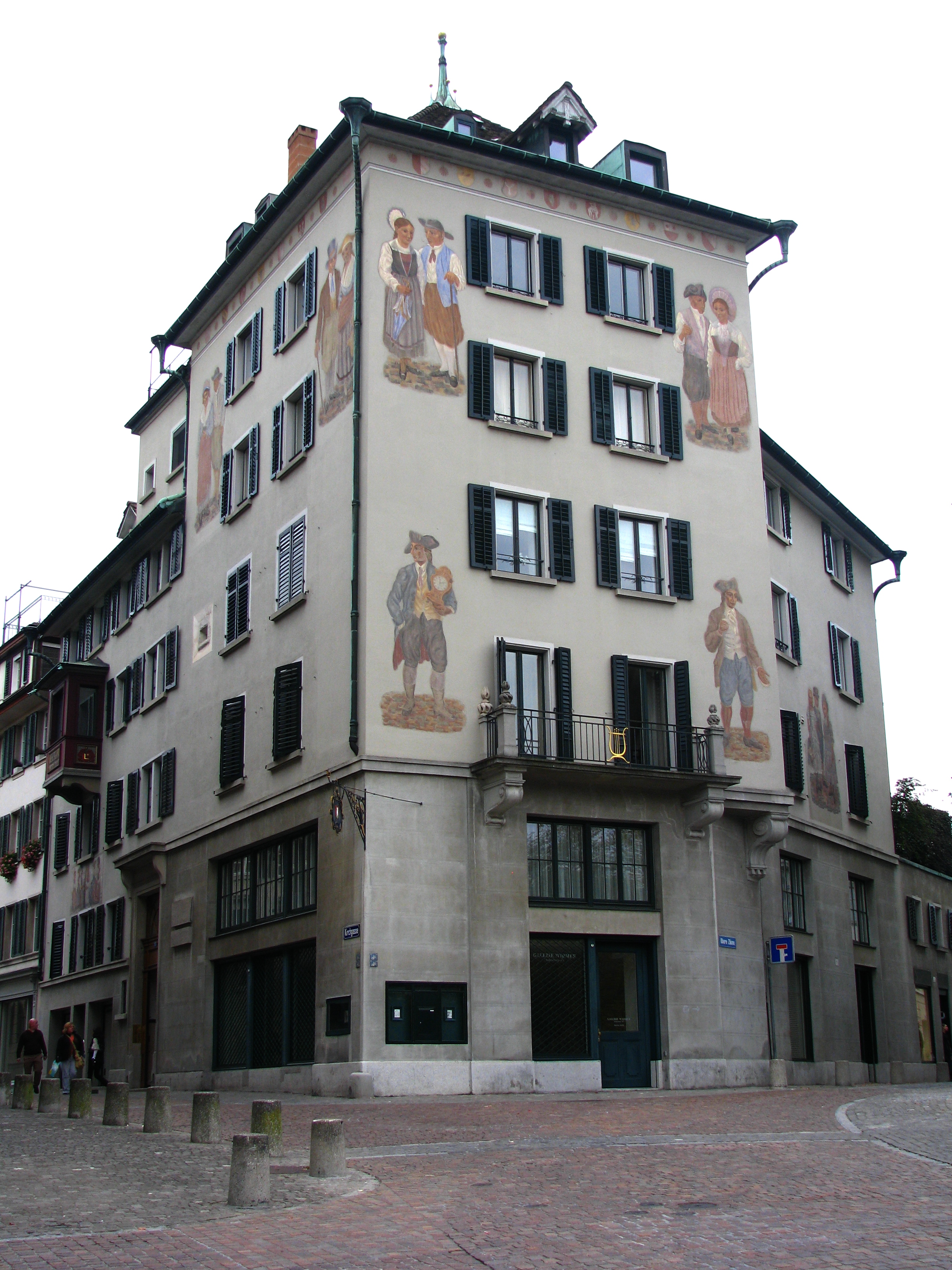
Steinhaus at Hirschengraben

== Early modern ramparts ==
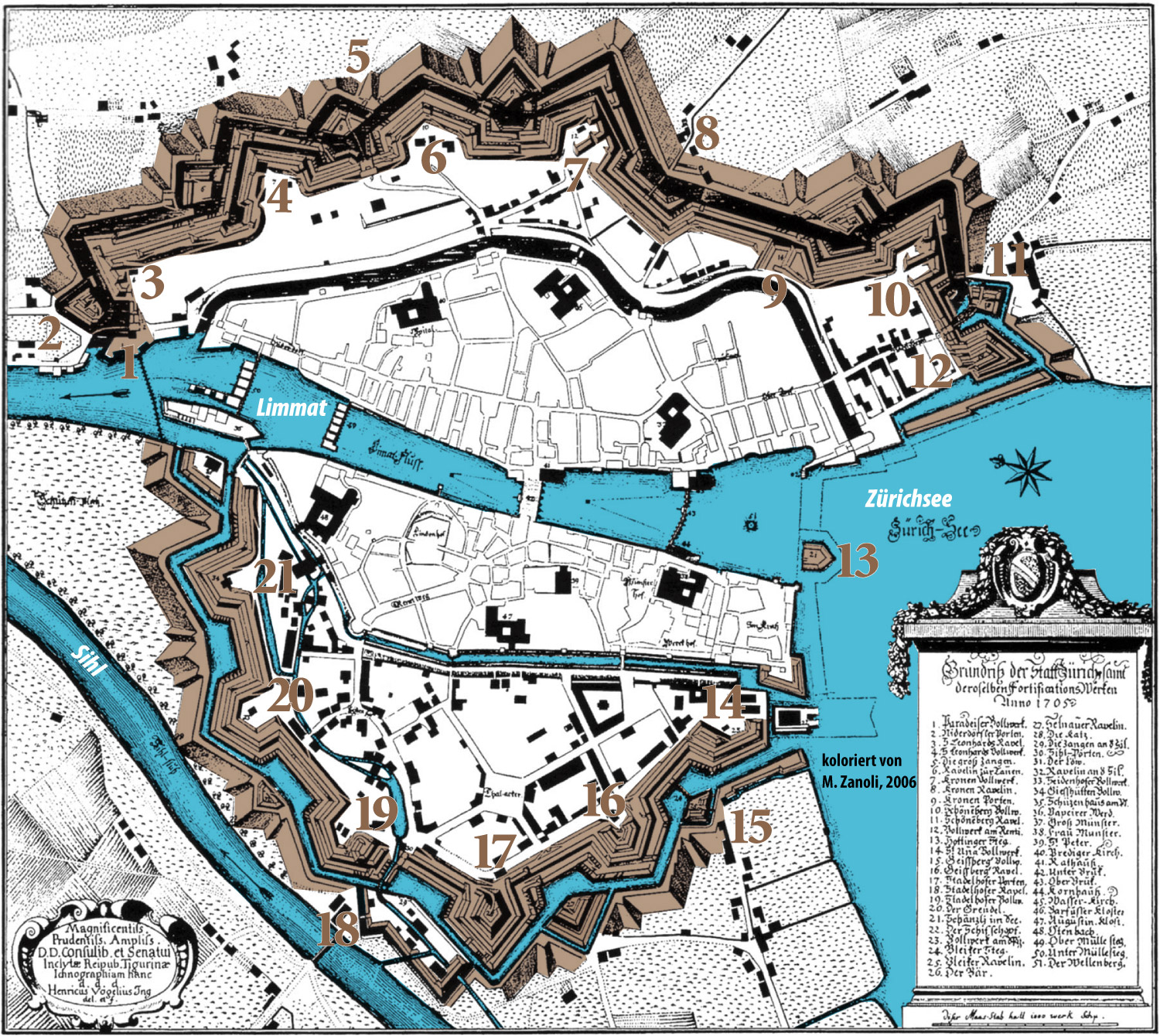
1705 map of Zürich (north is left), with fortifications coloured in grey

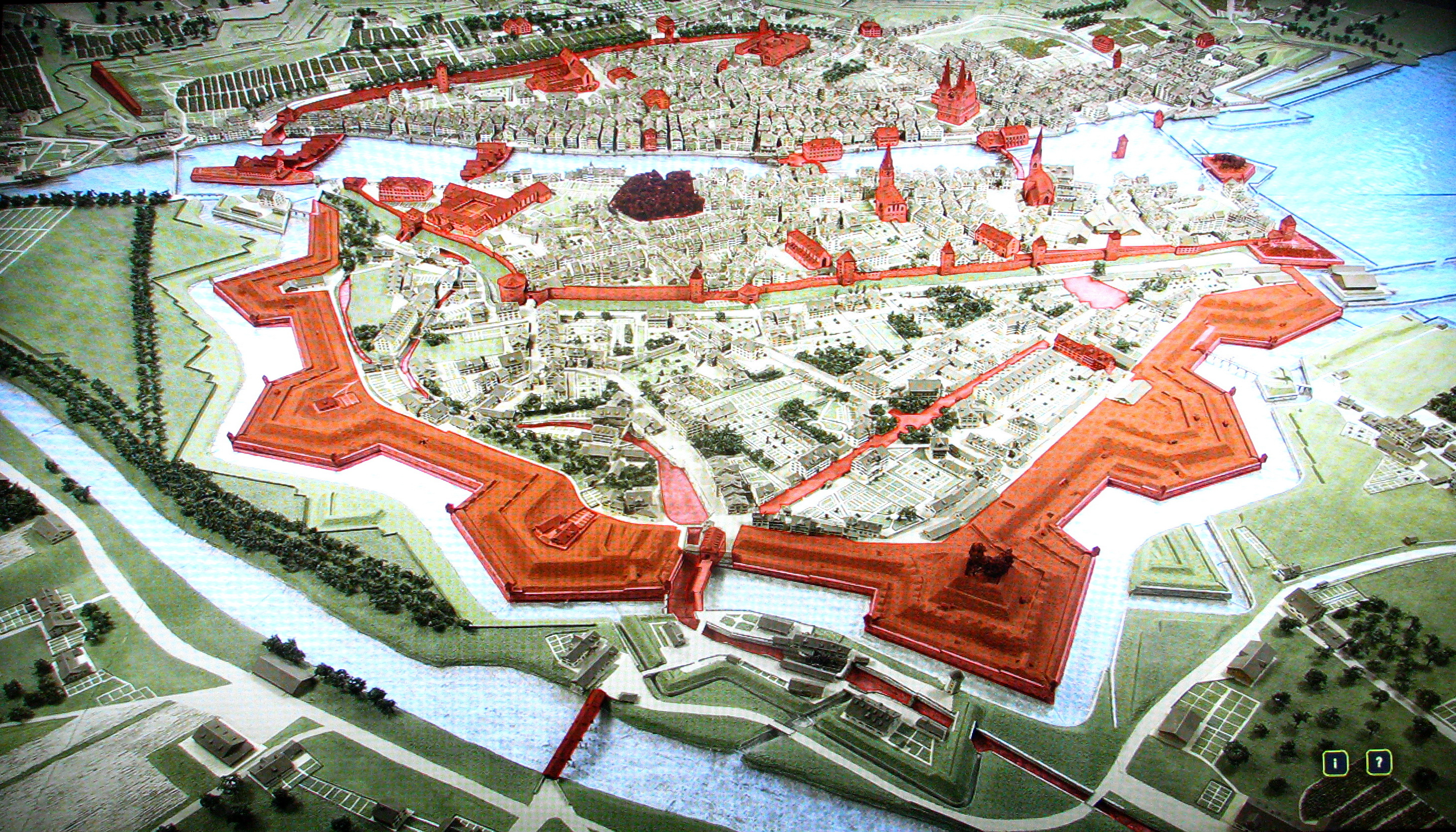
'Stadtmodell' (on LCD for visitors) by Hans Langmack, based on the so-called Müllerplan (published 1794)

The irrigated grave system of medieval Zürich, consisting of the internal (i.e. inside the town wall) Fröschengraben, the outer Sihlgraben and the intermediate town wall was first mentioned in 1258 AD as niuwer graben (new moat); the present Schanzengraben was still in construction around 1300. Over the decades, the time accumulating sludge was periodically dug out by day laborers or in forced labor to process. Due to its former military defensive use, the moat has a widely octagonal zig-zag form, and was completed as part of the Baroque fortifications of Zürich around 1642 AD, and the Bollwerk zur Katz became the eastern gunnery bastion of the city fortification.

In the late Middle Ages, the present Sechseläutenplatz area was the location of the former military harbour of the city of Zürich respectively part of the so-called Stadelhoferbollwerk bastion on Zürichsee lakeshore. The former Stadelhofer bulwark also was built as part of the so-called fourth city fortifications in 1643 AD. The bastion was built partly into the lake, and in 1673 the Stadelhofen ravelin was attached, and completely broken in 1837/38.

The Oetenbachbollwerk was a bastion of the fortifications, and was built under the supervision of Balthasar Keller in 1532. The stronghold replaced a wooden mounting in the garden of the Oetenbach convent and had to secure the western town wall and the gate at the Limmat. In 1642 the bulwark was covered, and in 1764 the adjoining Waisenhaus building provided as a storage room and economics building. In 1903 the bastion was broken as the last construction of the city's fortifications. Numerous finds came to light, including the grave stone of Ulrich I von Regensberg, which was misused as a loophole cornice of the bulwark.

From 1558 to 1562 the round Auf Dorf bastion with battlements was built at the site of the present Bellevueplatz at the junction of Limmatquai and Rämistrasse. Structurally, it was connected to the Langenöhrlisturm of the city fortification, and originally surrounded almost entirely by the water of Zürichsee respectively Limmat. The bulwark comprised casemates with loopholes and a platform for the artillery to defend against attackers on the lake, and to complete the opposite Bauschänzli bastion respectively the medieval Grendeltor. The remains were discovered on occasion of road works in March 2015.

From 1642, an impressive set of ramparts was built based on plans by Hans Georg Werdmüller and Johann Ardüser, at an immense cost and completed only in the second half of the 18th century. The ramparts included fifteen bastions, one of them built inside the Limmat (the Bauschänzli, location of the former Ravelin Kratz).

The ramparts were mostly destroyed in 1834, but parts of the walls and the western moat remain visible.

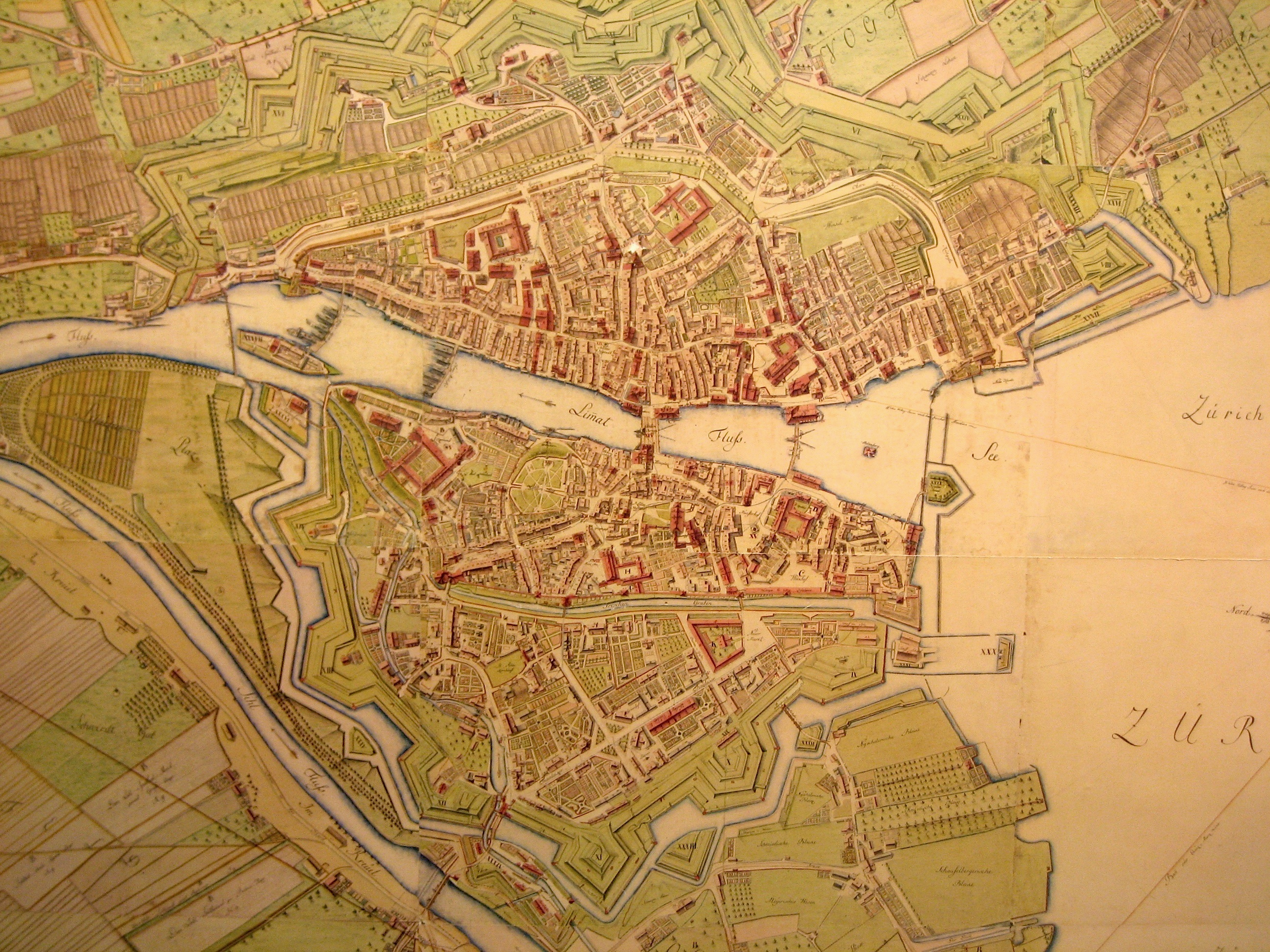
1793 map of Zürich (north is left), the so-called Müllerplan

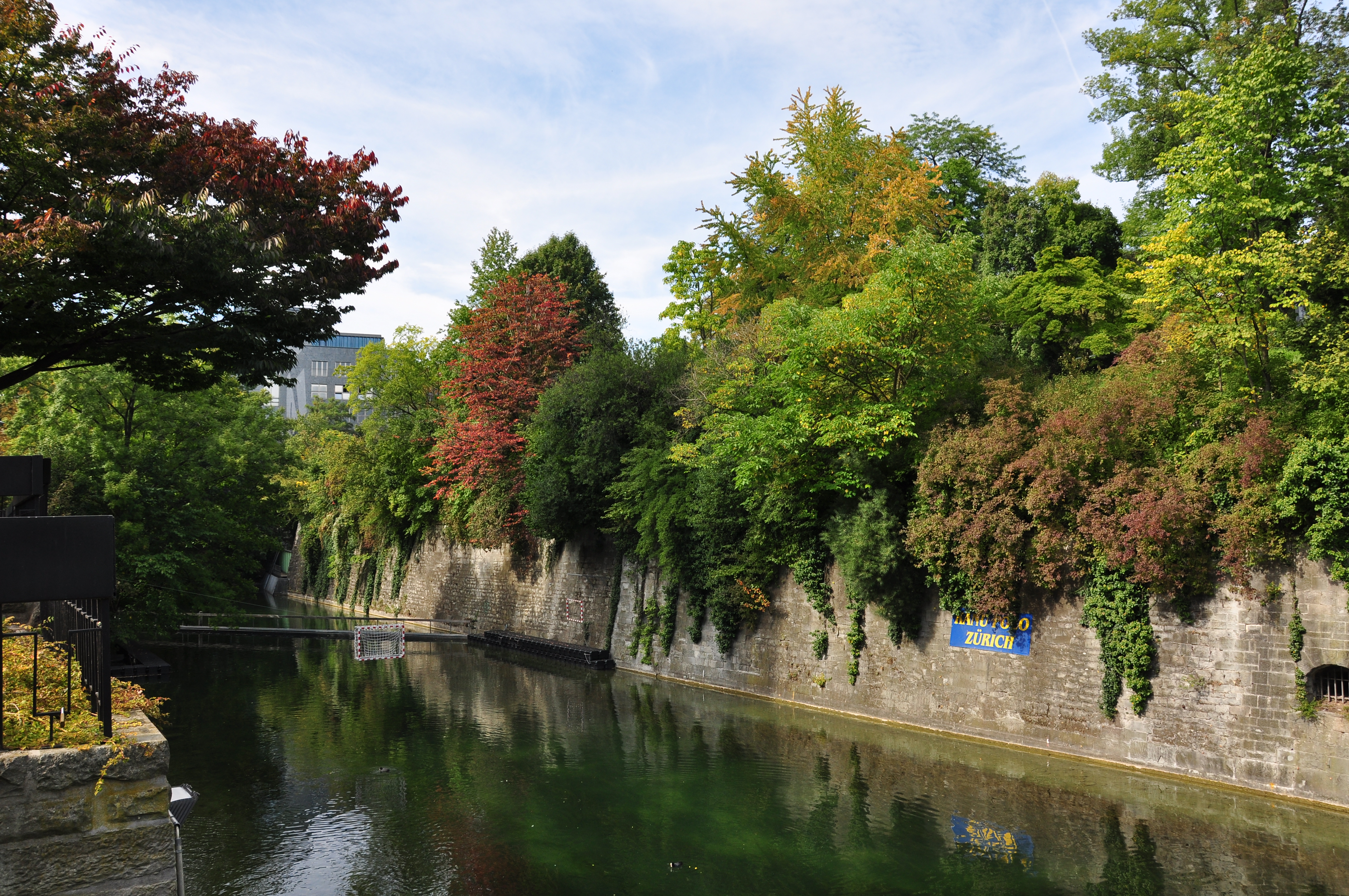
The moat (Schanzengraben) and the remains of the Bollwerk zur Katz (Old Botanical Garden), next to Selnau station

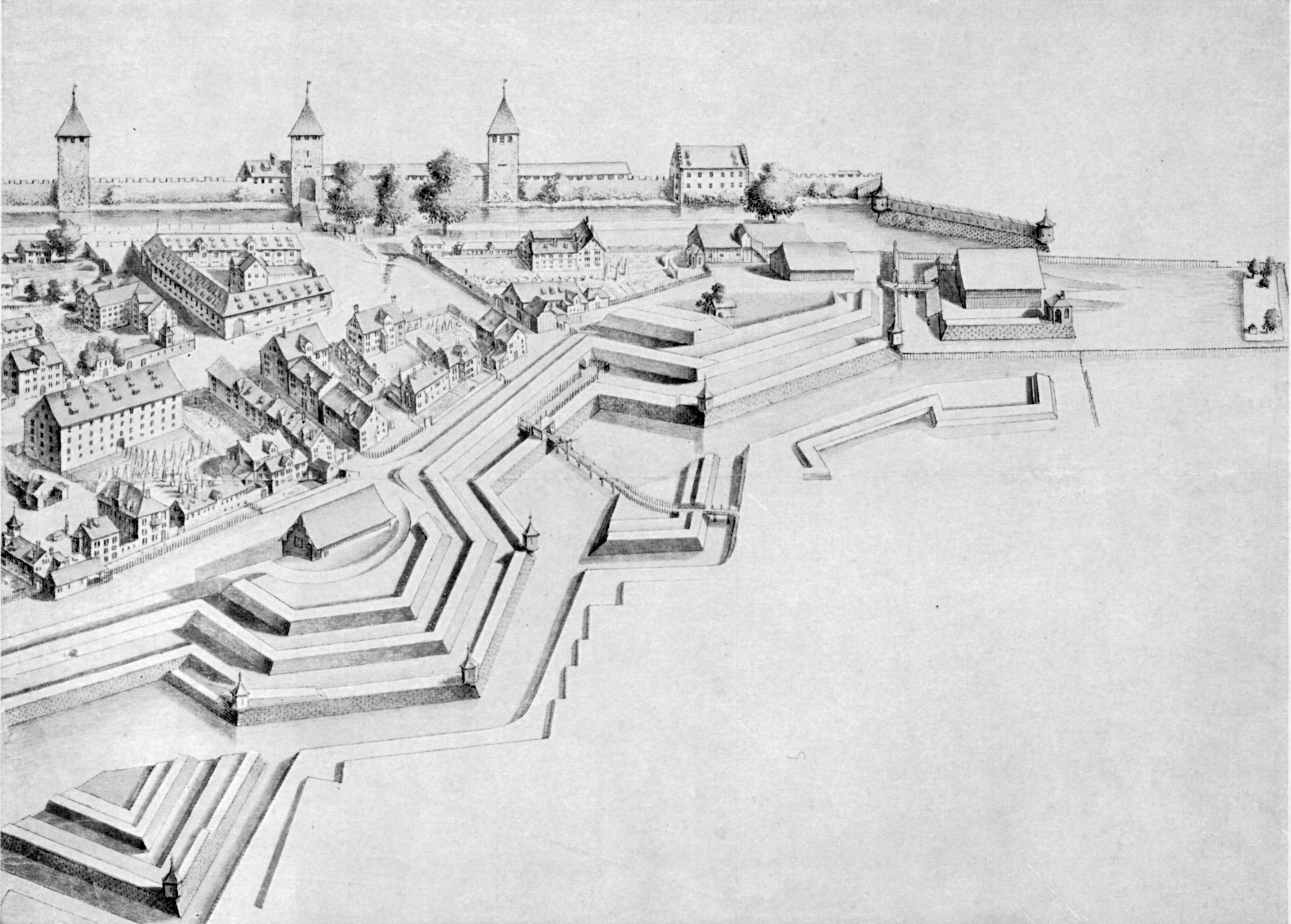
18th century sketch of the old and new walls on either side of Paradeplatz (at the time known as Neuer Markt)

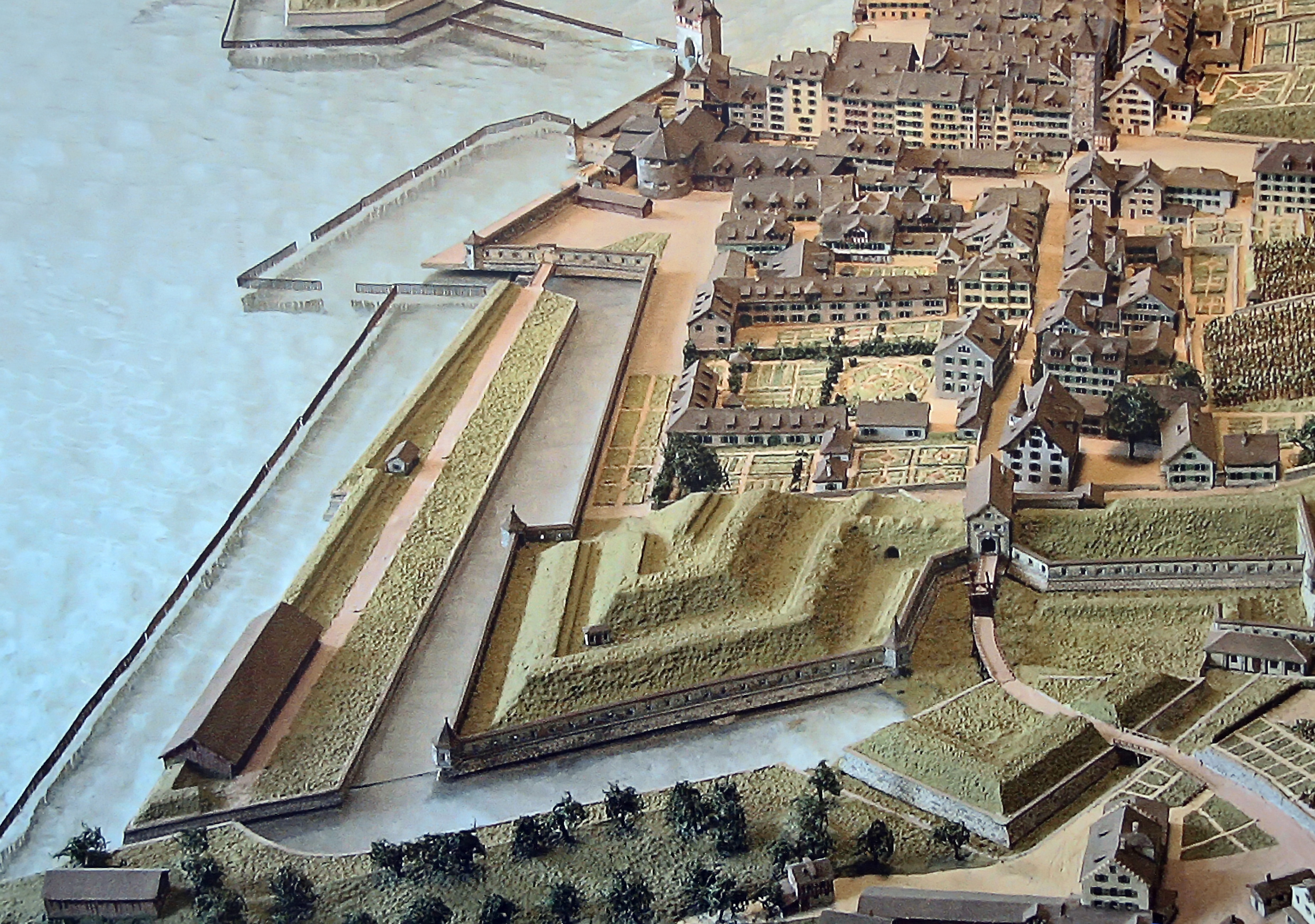
Stadelhoferbastion and former war harbour at, as of today, Sechseläutenplatz and Stadelhoferplatz
