= Boťany =

Village in eastern Slovakia

Boťany Battyán
- Municipality
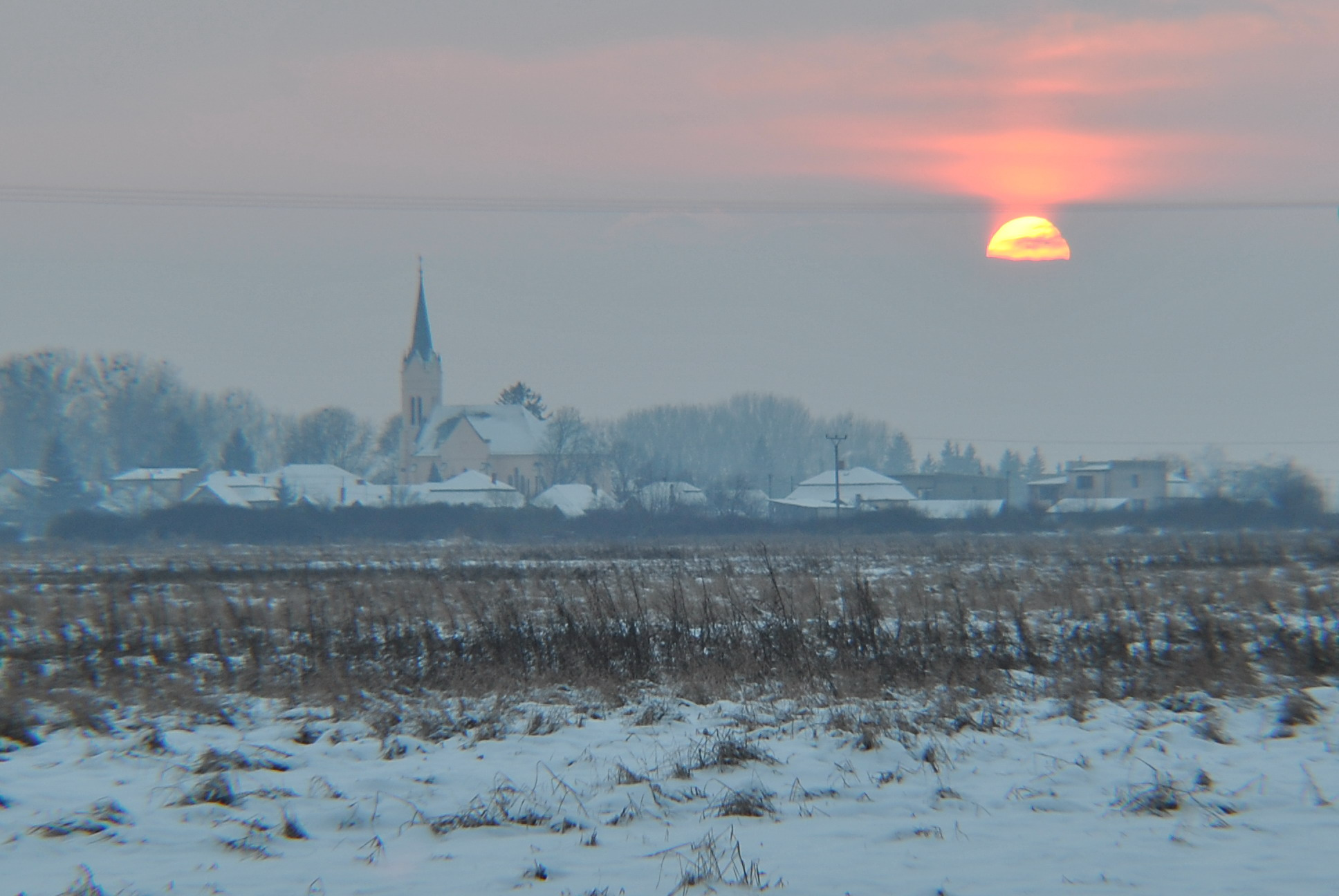

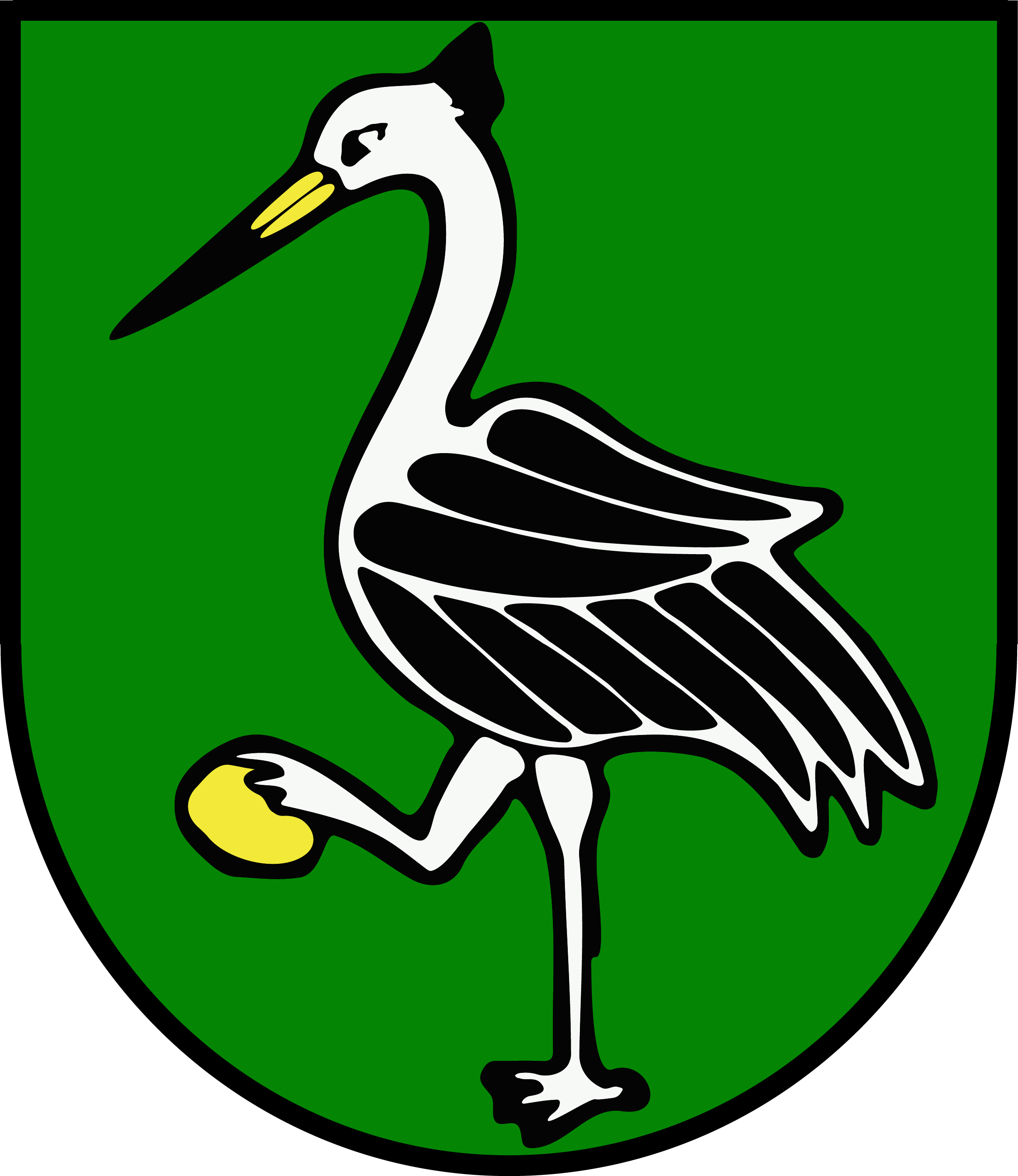
- Flag Coat of arms

- Location of Boťany in the Košice Region Location of Boťany in Slovakia
- Coordinates: 48.45°N 22.10°E
- Country: Slovakia
- Region: Košice Region
- District: Trebišov District
- First mentioned: 1332

Area
  - Total: 19.51 km^{2} (7.53 sq mi)
- Elevation: 101 m (331 ft)

Population (2025)
  - Total: 1,212
- Time zone: UTC+1 (CET)
  - Summer (DST): UTC+2 (CEST)
- Postal code: 764 3
- Area code: +421 56
- Vehicle registration plate (until 2022): TV
- Website: www.obecbotany.sk

Boťany (Slovak pronunciation: [ˈbɔcani]; Hungarian: Battyán) is a village and municipality in the Trebišov District in the Košice Region of eastern Slovakia.

== History ==
In historical records the village was first mentioned in 1332.

== Geography ==
The municipality lies at an altitude of 101 metres (331 ft) and covers an area of 19.51 km^{2} (7.53 sq mi) (2025).

== Population ==
Population statistic (10 years)
Year	1995	2005	2015	2025
Count	1082	1276	1241	1212
Difference		+17.92%	−2.74%	−2.33%

Population statistic
Year	2024	2025
Count	1219	1212
Difference		−0.57%

It has a population of 1212 people (31 December 2025).

=== Ethnicity ===
Census 2021 (1+ %)
Ethnicity	Number	Fraction
Hungarian	817	68.48%
Slovak	186	15.59%
Romani	135	11.31%
Not found out	134	11.23%
Total	1193	

In year 2021 was 1193 people by ethnicity 817 as Hungarian, 186 as Slovak, 135 as Romani, 134 as Not found out, 2 as Czech and 2 as Rusyn.

Note on population: The difference values of population numbers in the table "Population statistic" and in the sections "Ethnicity" & "Religion" is caused by the use of various statistical methods.

=== Religion ===
Census 2021 (1+ %)
Religion	Number	Fraction
Roman Catholic Church	683	57.25%
None	189	15.84%
Not found out	136	11.4%
Greek Catholic Church	78	6.54%
Calvinist Church	74	6.2%
Jehovah's Witnesses	17	1.42%
Total	1193	

In year 2021 was 1193 people by religion 683 from Roman Catholic Church, 189 from None, 136 from Not found out, 78 from Greek Catholic Church, 74 from Calvinist Church, 17 from Jehovah's Witnesses, 5 from Evangelical Church, 4 from Other and not ascertained christian church, 3 from Old Catholic Church, 2 from Christian Congregations in Slovakia, 1 from Islam and 1 from Church of Jesus Christ of Latter-day Saints.

== Facilities ==
The village has a post office, a public library and a football pitch.

== Genealogical resources ==
The records for genealogical research are available at the state archive "Statny Archiv in Kosice, Slovakia"

- Roman Catholic church records (births/marriages/deaths): 1719-1922 (parish A)
- Greek Catholic church records (births/marriages/deaths): 1795-1905 (parish B)
- Reformated church records (births/marriages/deaths): 1809-1929 (parish B)

== See also ==
- List of municipalities and towns in Slovakia
