= Botanica (disambiguation) =

A botánica is a Latin-American-Caribbean style shop specializing in articles of folk magic and similar merchandise.

Botanica may also refer to:

- Botanica (band), an American music rock group
- Botanica (Transformers), a character from Beast Machines
- Botanica (series), a series of puzzle adventure games
- Botanica, The City of Wichita's botanical gardens
- Sectorul Botanica, a sector of Chișinău, Moldova
