= National Botanical Garden =

National Botanic(al) Garden(s) may refer to:

- Australian National Botanic Gardens
- National Botanic Garden of Belgium
- National Botanical Garden (Botswana)
- National Kandawgyi Botanical Gardens, Myanmar
- China National Botanical Garden
- South China National Botanical Garden
- National Botanic Gardens of India
- National Botanic Gardens (Ireland)
- National Botanic Garden of Latvia
- National Botanical Garden (Nepal)
- Kirstenbosch National Botanical Garden, South Africa
- Hryshko National Botanical Garden, Ukraine
- National Tropical Botanical Garden, four gardens in Hawaii and Florida
- United States Botanic Garden, Washington, DC
- National Botanic Garden of Wales
- National Botanic Garden (Zimbabwe)

== See also ==
- List of botanical gardens
