= Botany Bay (disambiguation) =

Botany Bay is a bay in New South Wales, Australia.

Botany Bay may also refer to:

== Places ==
- Botany Bay (Chorley), a community in the North West of England
- Botany Bay, Derbyshire, a small hamlet in South Derbyshire, England
- Botany Bay, Kent, a bay in Broadstairs, Kent, England
- Botany Bay, London, a village in the London Borough of Enfield, England
- Botany Bay, Monmouthshire, an area in the Wye Valley, Wales
- Botany Bay Plantation Wildlife Management Area, a state preserve on Edisto Island, South Carolina, United States
- City of Botany Bay, a former local government area in New South Wales
- Botany Bay, Trinity Peninsula, a bay on Trinity Peninsula, Antarctica
- Botany Bay, Victoria Land, a bay in Victoria Land, Antarctica
- Botany Bay, former name of an area of Henbury, Bristol, United Kingdom
- Botany Bay, a residential quadrangle in Trinity College, Dublin.
- Botany Bay, a residential area and preserve at St. Thomas, United States Virgin Islands

== In entertainment ==
- Botany Bay, a 1941 novel by Charles Nordhoff and James Norman Hall
- "Botany Bay" (song), a folk song recorded by Rolf Harris among others
- Botany Bay (film), a 1953 film starring Alan Ladd
- SS Botany Bay, a prisoner transport spaceship in the fictional Star Trek universe
- Botany Bay, a fictional planet in the novel Friday (novel) by Robert A. Heinlein
- Botany Bay, a fishing boat used for illegal whale-harpooning in the movie Free Willy 3 The Rescue.
- Jim Jones at Botany Bay, a folk song recorded by Bob Dylan among others
- The Shores of Botany Bay, an Irish folk song about a bricklayer emigrating to Botany Bay

== See also ==
- Botany Bay National Park, a national park in New South Wales, Australia
- Chrysolopus spectabilis, a species of weevil found in south-eastern Australia, commonly known as the Botany Bay diamond weevil
- Port Botany, New South Wales, a suburb located to the north of Botany Bay, New South Wales, Australia
- Port Botany (seaport), a seaport located on the shore of Botany Bay, New South Wales, Australia
