= Old Botanical Garden, Zurich =

Botanical garden in Zurich, Switzerland

Coordinates: 47°22′16″N 8°32′01″E

Alter Botanischer Garten Zürich
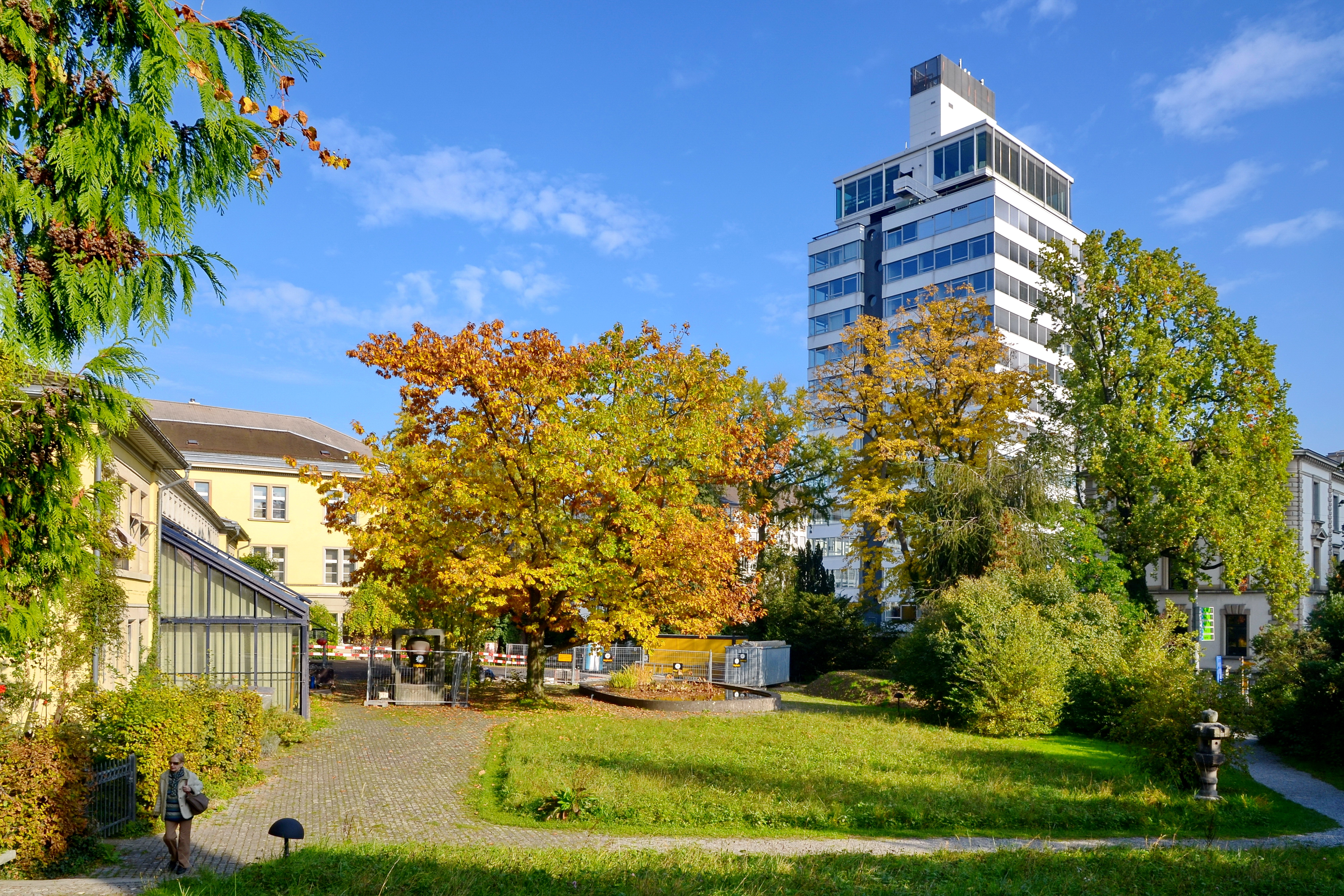
- Alter Botanischer Garten Zürich
- Interactive map of Alter Botanischer Garten Zürich
- Date opened: Founded in 1837
- Location: Pelikanstrasse 40, CH-8001 Zürich
- Land area: 5 acres (2.0 ha)
- Website: Official website (in German)

The Old Botanical Garden (German: Alter Botanischer Garten) is a botanical garden and arboretum in the Swiss city of Zürich. The garden is, among the neighbored Schanzengraben moat and the Bauschänzli bastion, one of the last remains of the Baroque fortifications of Zürich, that was begun in 1642.

The garden contains busts of botanists Heinrich Zollinger, Augustin Pyramus de Candolle and physician Conrad Gessner.

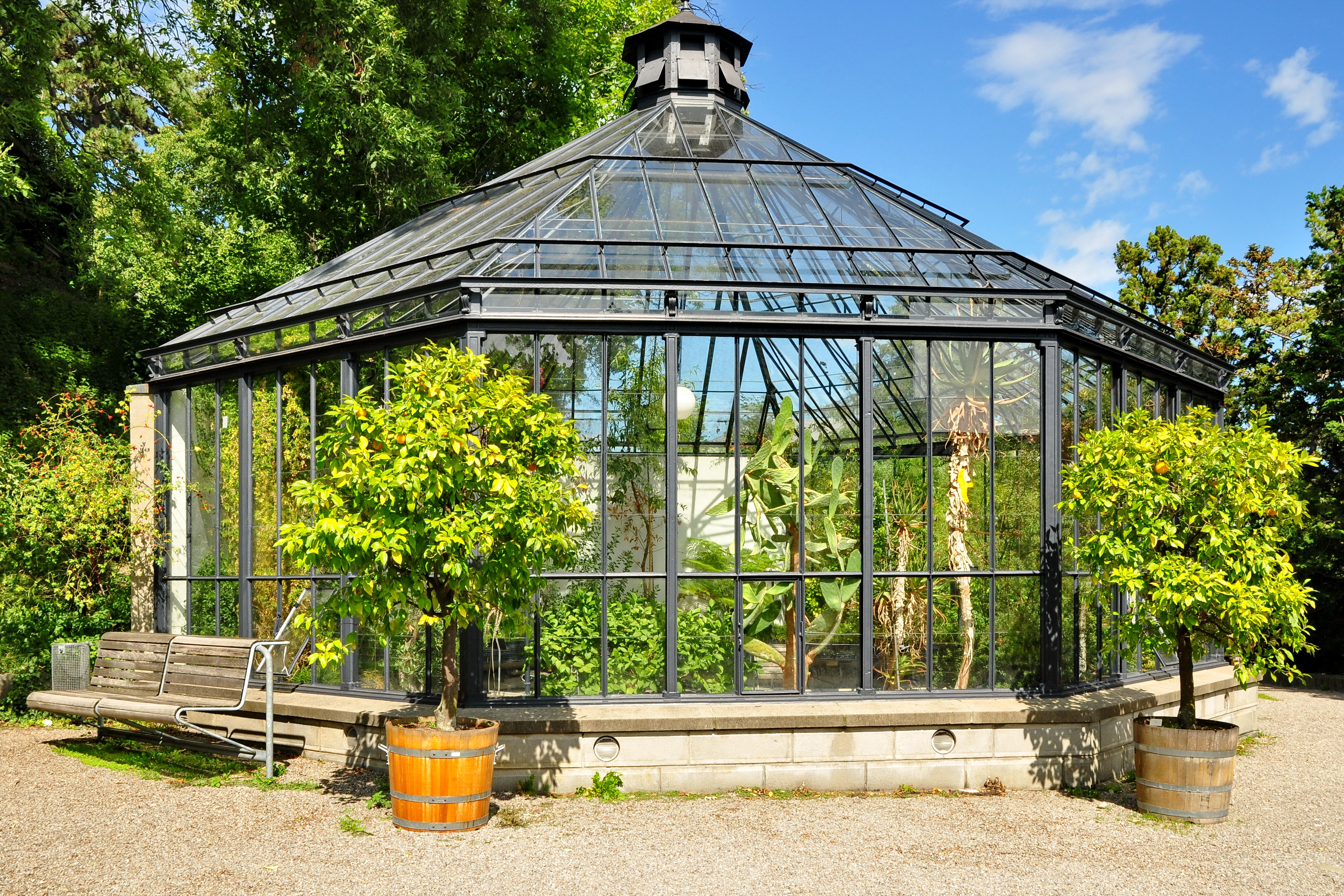
Palmenhaus (1851–1877)

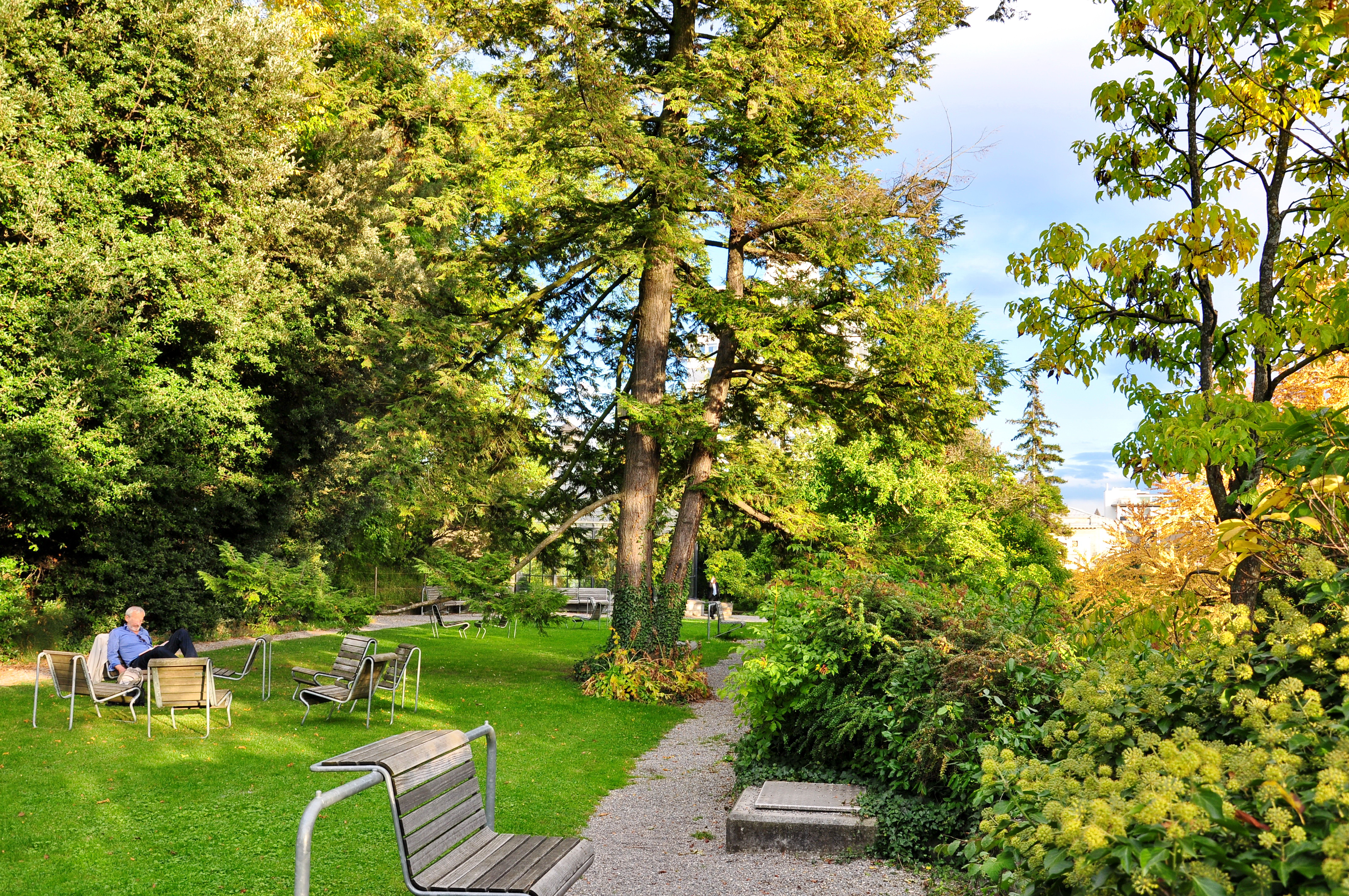
Western parts of the gardens

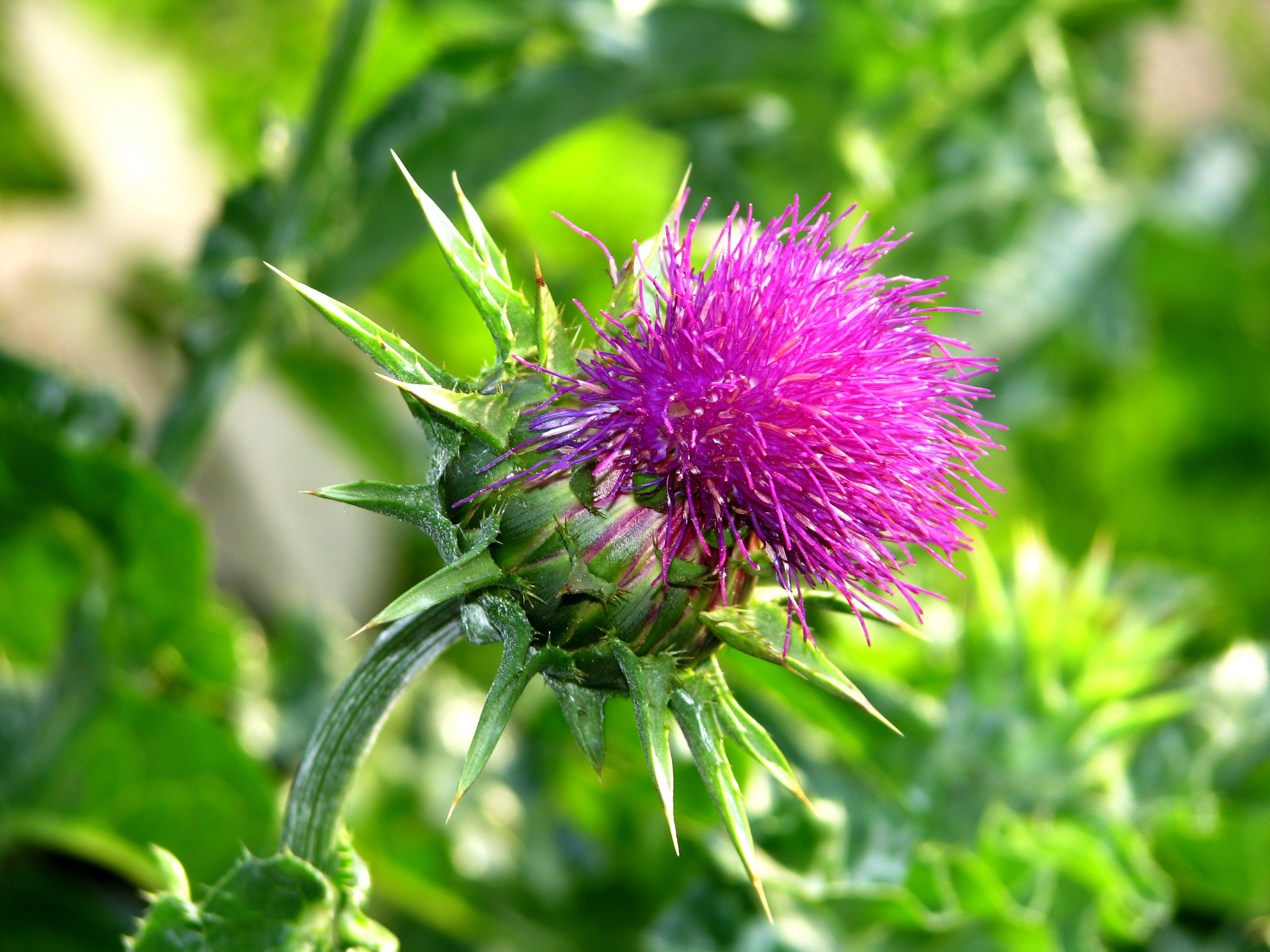
Gessner-Garten: Silybum marianum

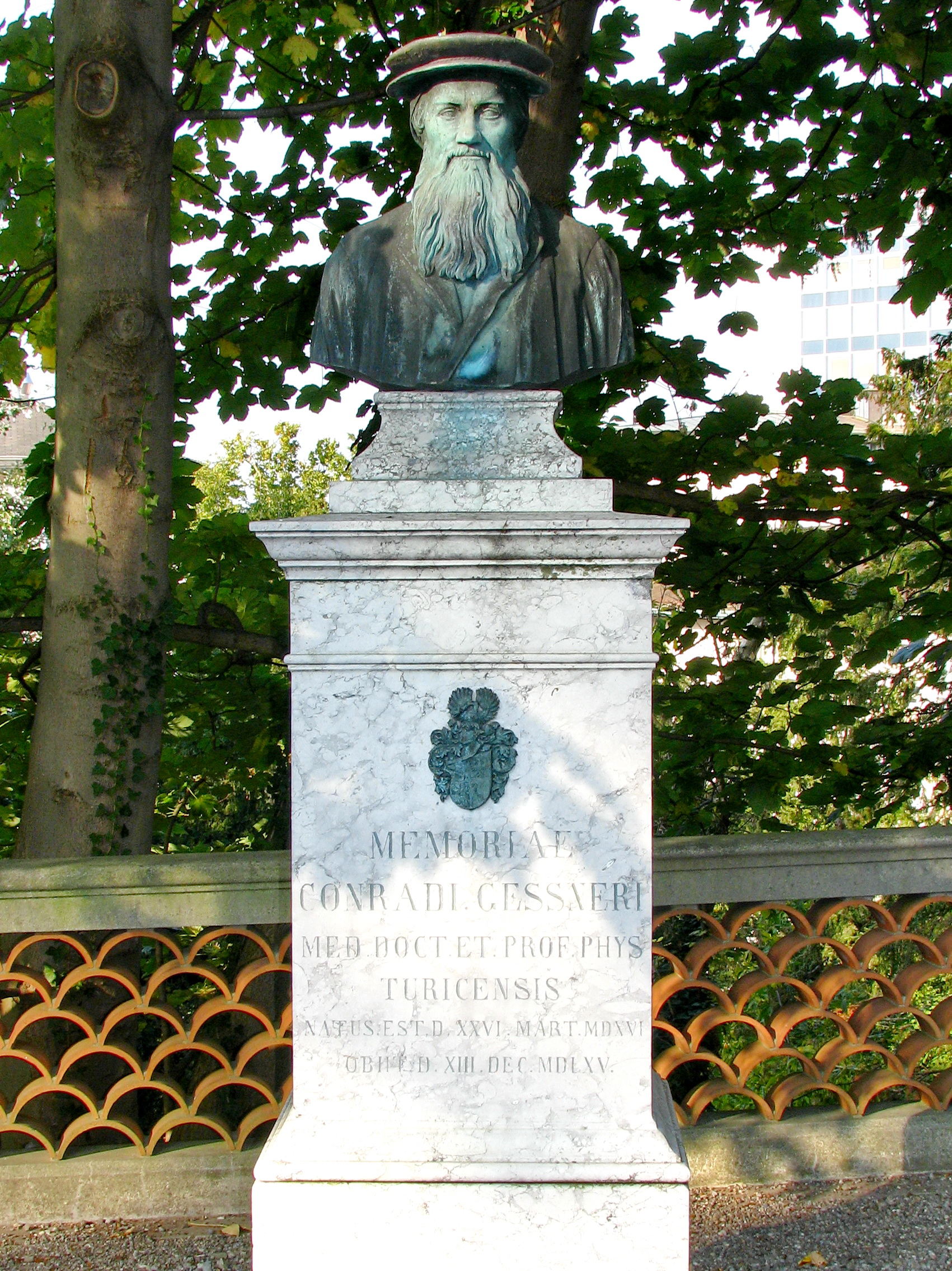
Conrad Gessner memorial

== Facilities ==
The Garden is located on the former zur Katz bastion in the city centre near the Sihlporte area. Opening times are daily from April to September 7:00–19.00 (7 pm), October to March 8:00–18:00 (6 pm). Trams 2 and 9 stop at the nearby Sihlstrasse stop. Although the Old Botanical Garden is owned by the University of Zurich, it should not be mistaken for the Botanical Garden of the University of Zurich, which opened in 1977 and is located at Zollikerstrasse in the Weinegg quarter of the city. The present facilities also house the ethnological museum (Völkerkundemuseum) of the University of Zürich.

== History ==
The origins of the first botanical garden are based on Conrad Gessner's (1516–1565) private herbarium. A Gessner descendant, Johannes Gessner (1709–1790) who was a physician and naturalist, founded Zürich's first botanical garden in 1746, in co-operation with the Naturforschende Gesellschaft Zürich (Zürich Botanical Society).

In 1833, the Canton of Zürich changed this first location to the so-called Schimmelgut, which was where the University of Zürich was founded. On dissolution of the ramparts zur Katz in 1837, the still existing plant at the Schanzengraben moat was built. The garden was designed by the university's gardener Leopold Karl Theodor Fröbel (1810–1907). In 1851 its Palmhaus (a greenhouse) was opened – constructed of glass and wood, in 1877 the octagonal glass pavilion got an iron frame. Today, the pavilion is primarily used for concerts, theater and exhibitions.

The terrain of the garden was limited by surrounding buildings, whilst the shadows of these buildings hindered growth conditions for the plants. Thus, in the second half of the 20th century, an urgently needed expansion was impossible, and as the botanical buildings were in poor condition, the administration decided to move the gardens from the city center to a more peripheral location within the city, where there was room to expand. In 1971 the old park of the Bodmer-Abegg family in the Weinegg quarter was selected, and in 1976 the new botanical garden was opened there.

Since 1976 the Old Botanical Garden, as it is now known, has been used as a recreation area, as the location of the Völkerkundemuseum (ethnological museum) of the University of Zürich, as the site of an arboretum and of the so-called Gessner-Garten.

== Arboretum and Gessner-Garten ==
The arboretum is remarkable, as is the idyllic location on the Schanzengraben moat in the midst of Zürich, and therefore the garden is a popular recreation area.

Gessner-Garten on the hilltop, a medieval herb garden, is a memorial to Conrad Gessner. The southern gun bastion of the fortifications of Zürich was at the highest point of the former ramparts zur Katz. The guns at the fortification were called Katz. Opened on 27 May 1997, the garden was built by private horticultural companies and financed by the Pro Katz foundation, with the object of maintaining the botanical garden. At the northern end of the herb garden, we find the Conrad Gessner memorial.

The Gessner garden shows 50 medicinal plants (herbs and shrubs), used by 16th century's healers, each with a citation of a healer from that period, such as Cynara cardunculus, Potentilla erecta, Linum usitatissimum, Paeonia officinalis, Silybum marianum, Juniperus communis, Fragaria vesca, Artemisia absinthium and more. The garden features herbs, which for centuries have been healing illness or having beneficial effects in infirmity. The signs by the plants give us an insight into the medicinal knowledge of Conrad Gessner and his contemporaries, such as Hieronymus Bock (1498–1554) and Leon Hart Fuchs (1501–1566). Another herb garden dedicated to Conrad Gessner is situated in the former cloister of the Grossmünster respectively Carolinum.

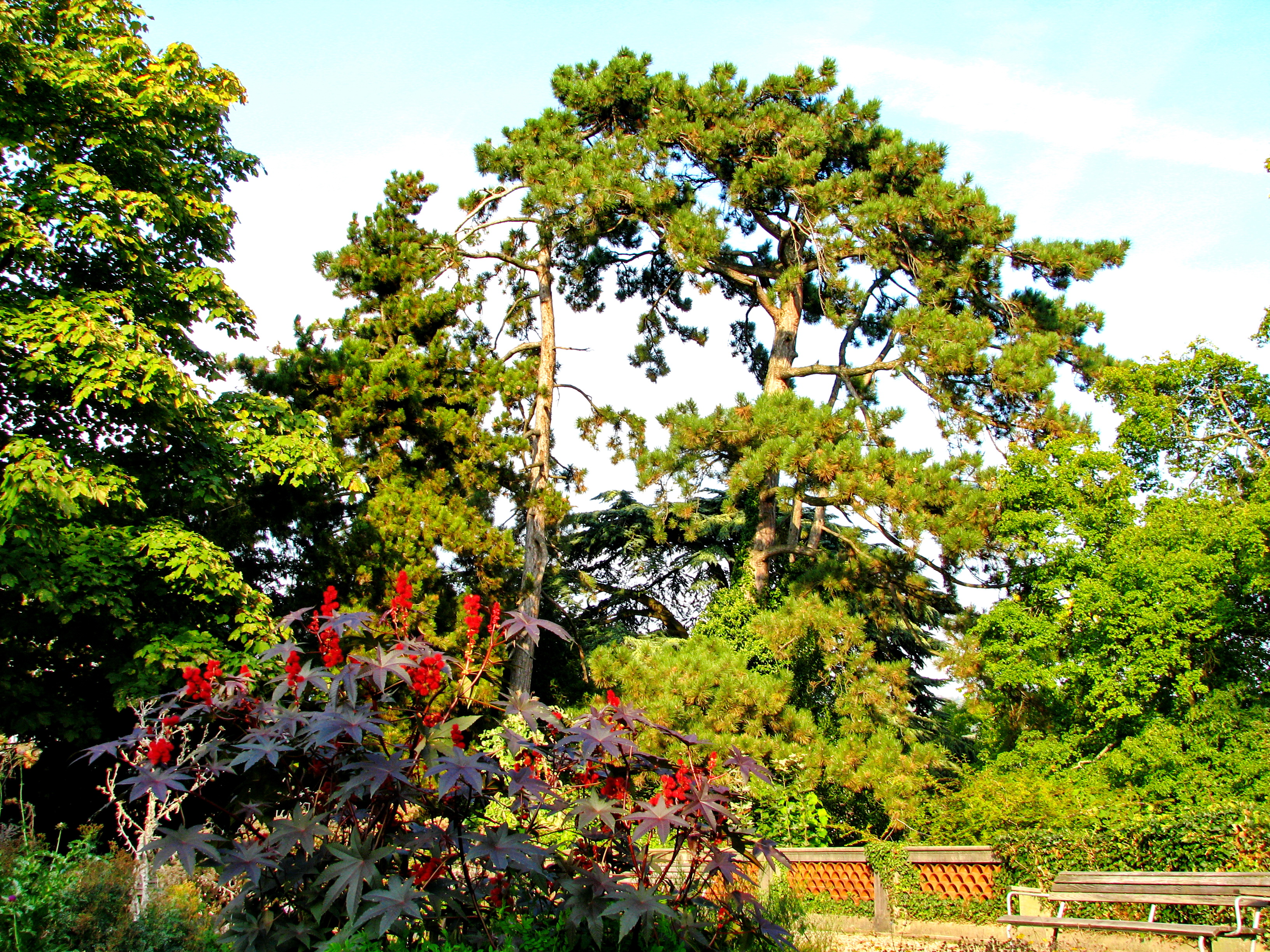
Parts of the arboretum as seen from the hilltop Gessner-Garten

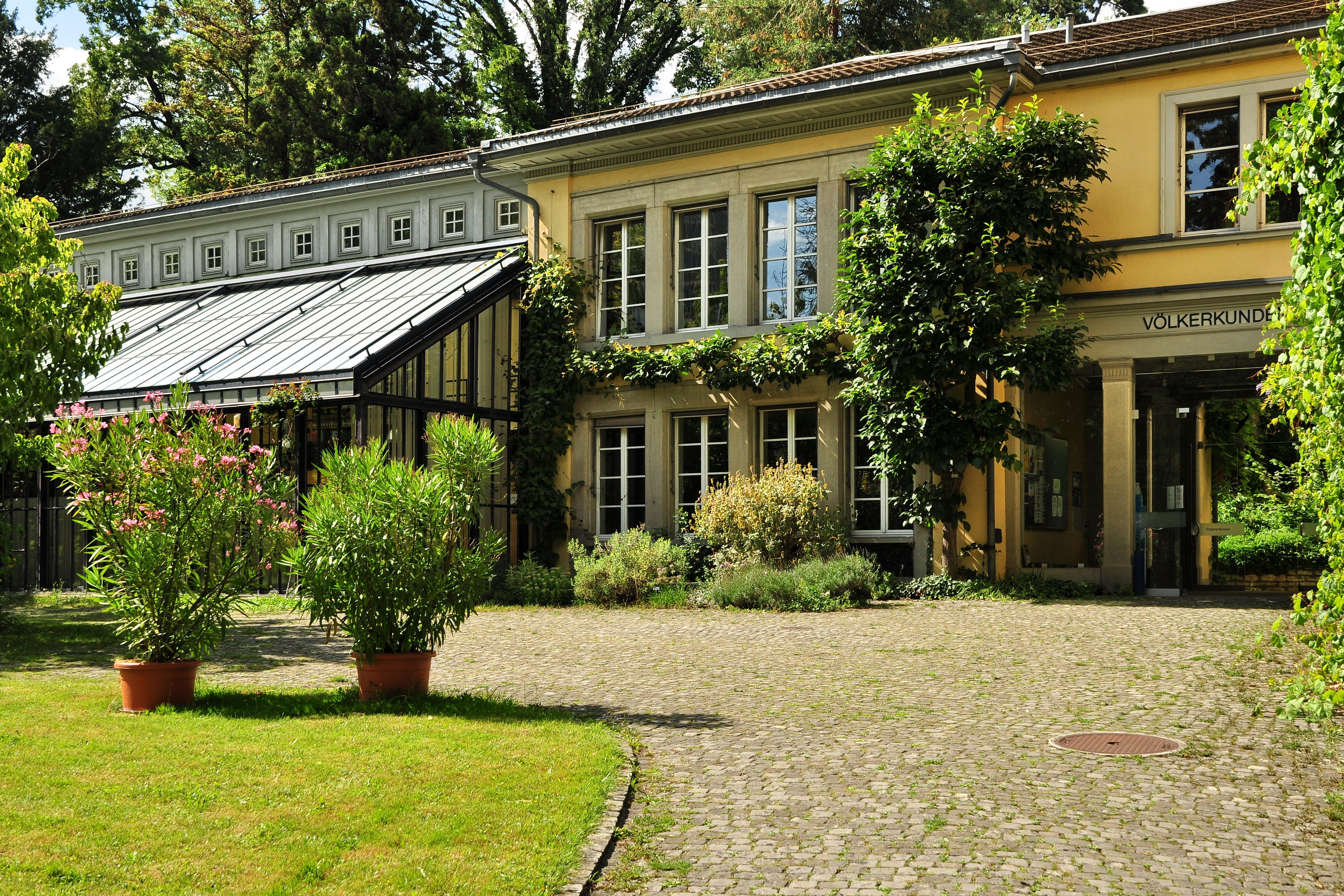
Museum of Ethnology buildings

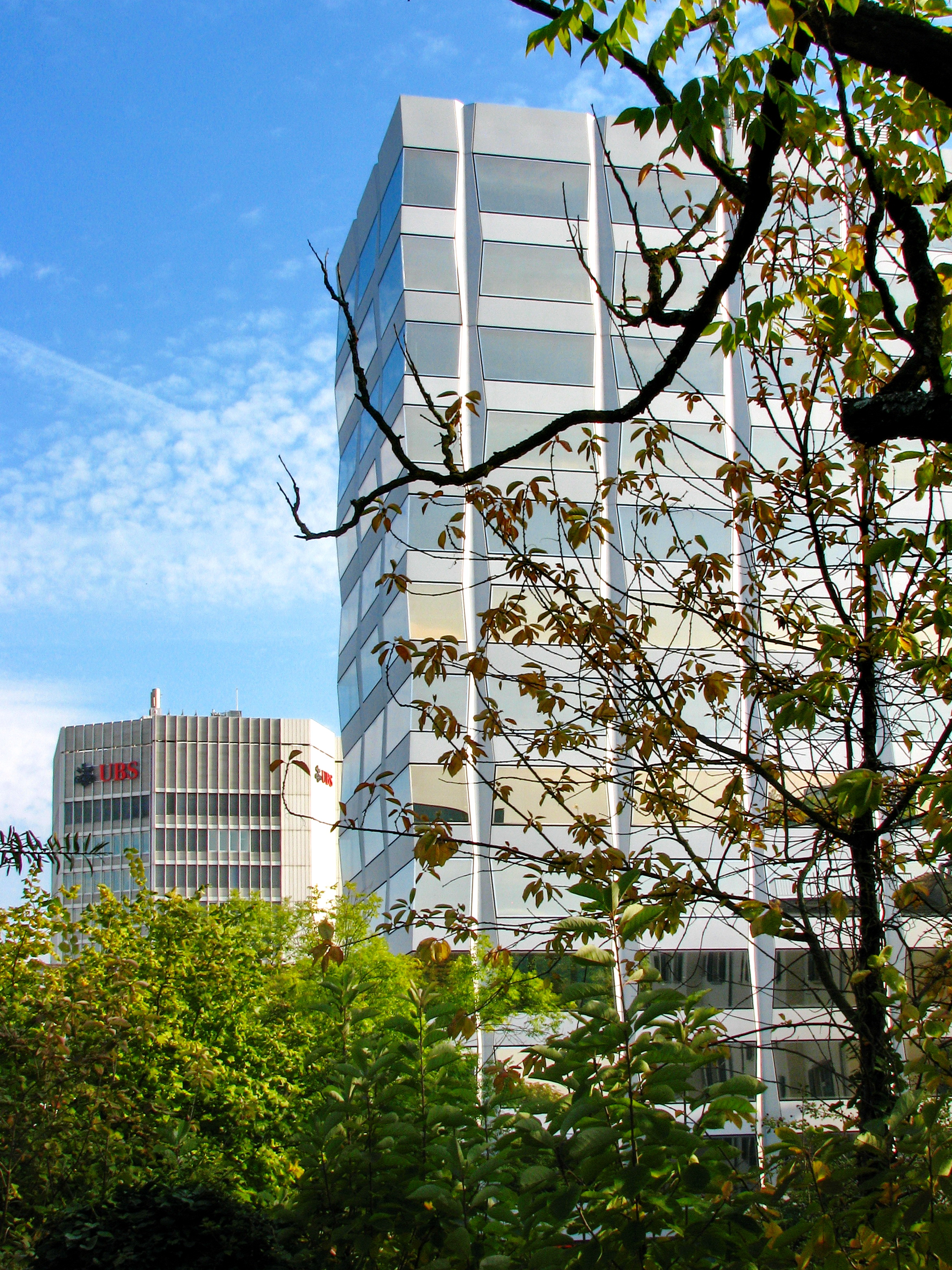
Arboretum, neighboring SIA and UBS buildings

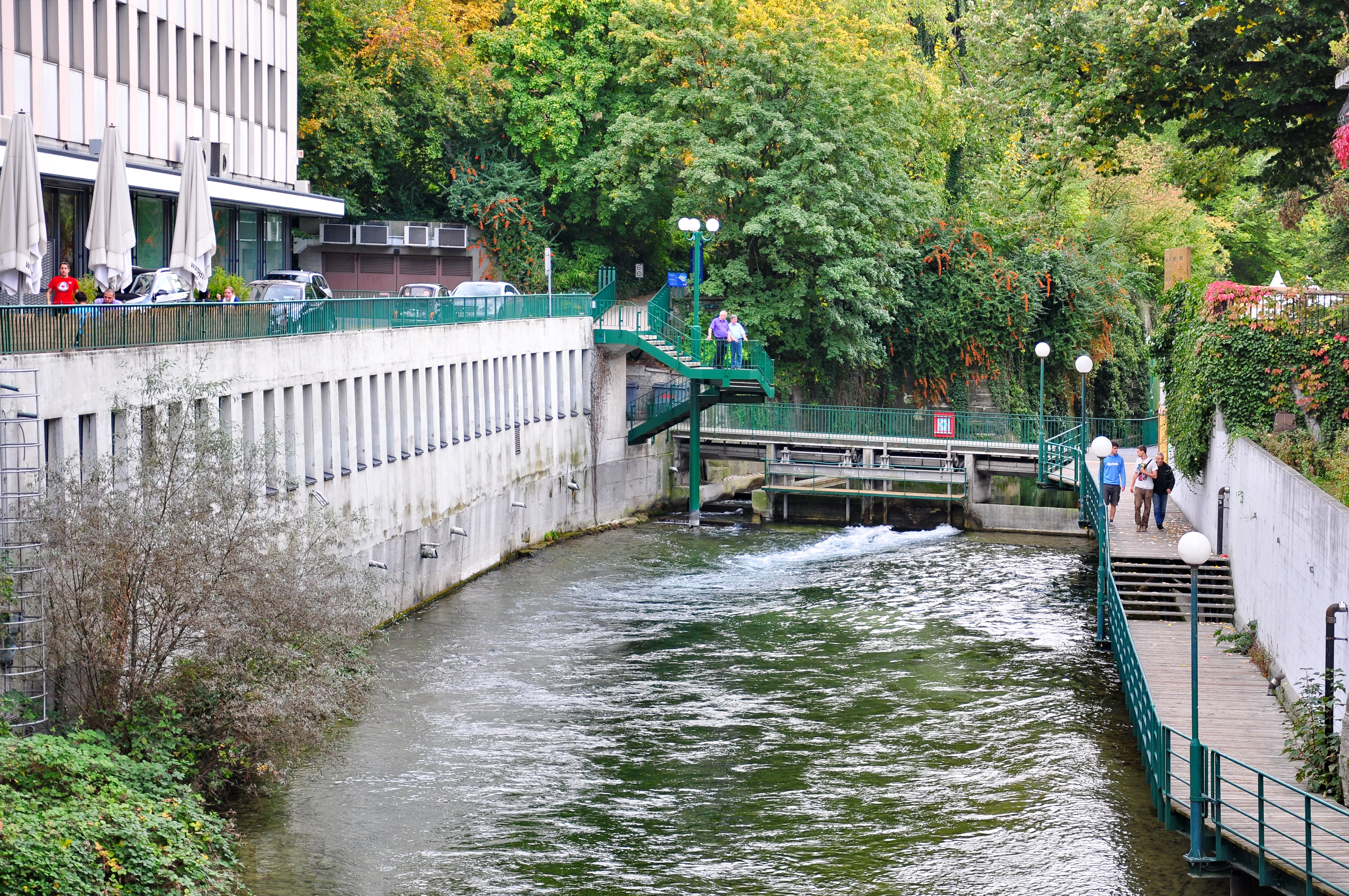
Schanzengraben, remaining «zur Katz» fortification and parts of the arboretum, as see from Sihlporte

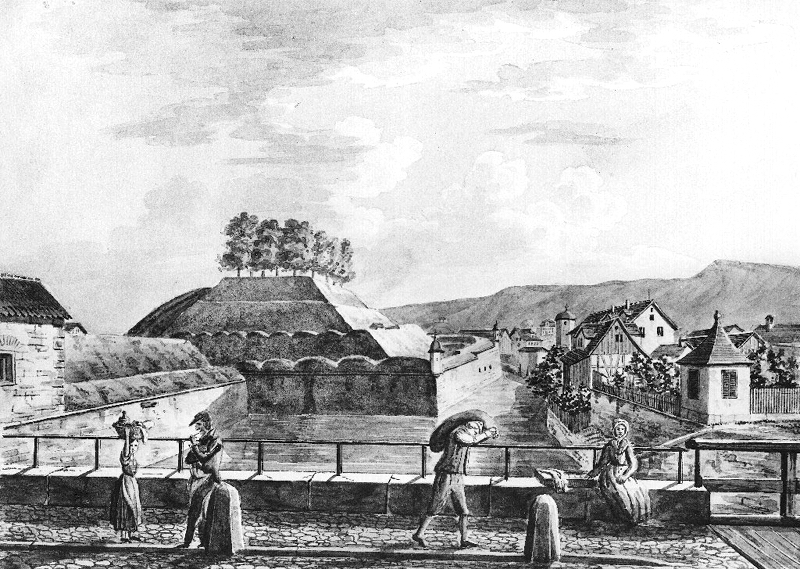
Katz bulwark shortly before it was rebuilt into the present botanical garden

== Katz bulwark (Bollwerk zur Katz) ==
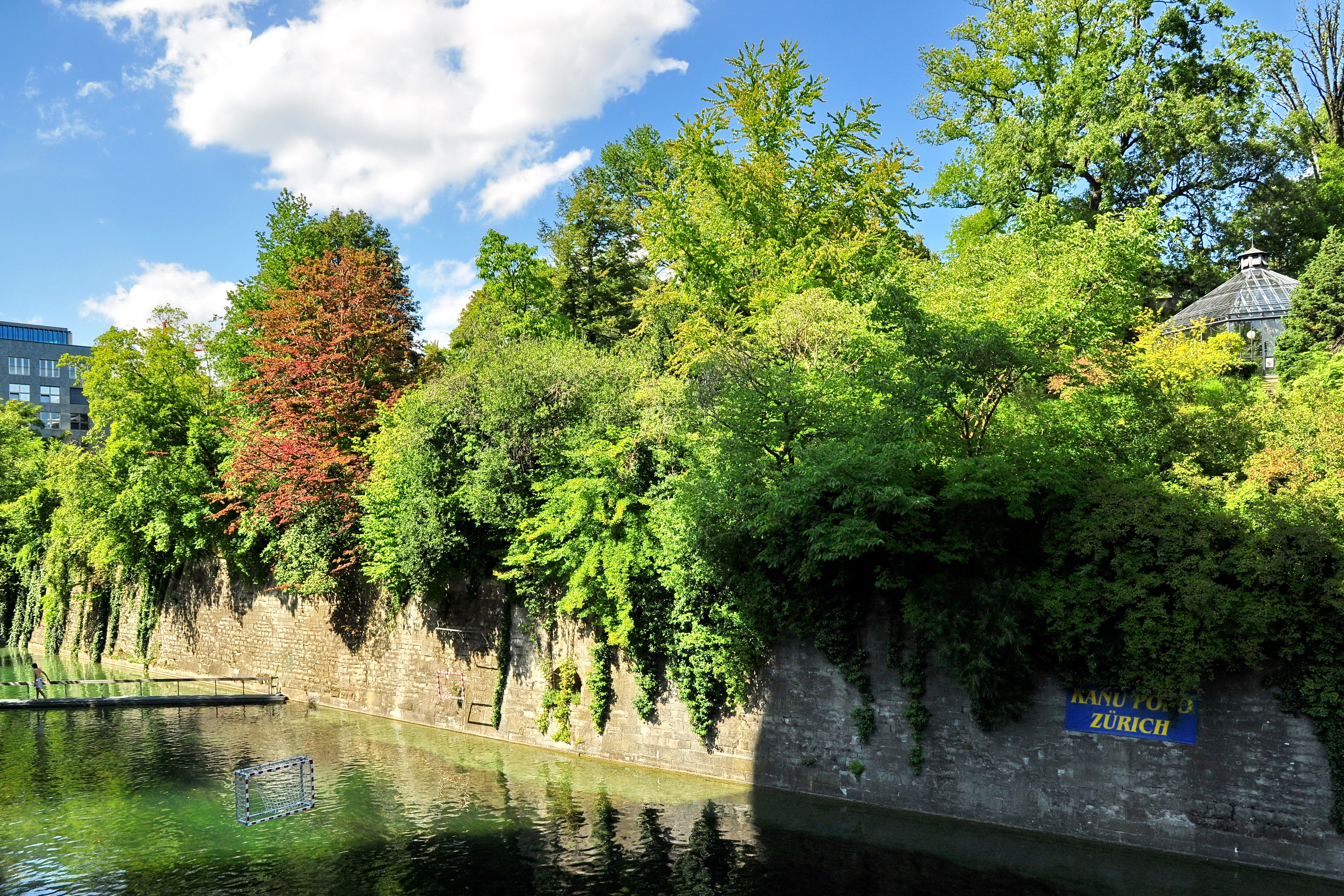
Schanzengraben and Katz

The Bollwerk zur Katz (German name) is besides the Bauschänzli river island the last remaining bulwark of the 17th-century city fortifications. The first structures of this bastion were built between 1648 and 1664 and the final expansion took place from 1673 to 1675. The final construction stage of this centrally positioned military factory on Schanzengraben also had two casemates, two underground vaults for purposes of defense, and a cavalier on the hilltop that was overlooking the area outside of the Schanzengraben moat. The cavalier was particularly a strong increased gun emplacement, which towered over the adjacent defense walls and thus enabled additional covering fire. Thanks to the altitude, a strong and large-scale defense was maintained by its powerful and therefore more far-reaching guns up to the present General-Guisan-Quai on the lake shore, the Sihlfeld area towards the Limmat Valley. From at least 1661 there originated also, incidentally, the only access for larger carriages into the town, the so-called Sihlporte which is the name of the area west of the botanical garden at the present Schanzengraben moat. After the cessation of defense purposes, from 1834 the upstream curtain walls were demolished, and in 1935 the hilltop bulwark was rebuilt to house the Gessner-Garten.

== Cultural heritage of national importance ==
The garden is listed in the Swiss inventory of cultural property of national and regional significance as a Class A object of national importance.
