= Plant Science (journal) =

- Discipline: Botany
- Language: English
- Edited by: Eduardo Blumwald, Erich Grotewold, Liwen Jiang, David Wendehenne

Publication details
- Former name(s): Plant Science Letters
- History: 1880-present
- Publisher: Elsevier
- Frequency: Monthly
- Impact factor: 3.712 (2017)

Standard abbreviations
- ISO 4: Plant Sci.

Indexing
- CODEN: PLSCE4
- ISSN: 0168-9452 (print); 1873-2259 (web)
- LCCN: 92660993
- OCLC no.: 12148556

Links
- Journal homepage; Plant Science archives; Plant Science Letters archives

Plant Science is a peer-reviewed scientific journal of plant biology. The journal was originally established as Plant Science Letters in 1973, changed its name to Plant Science in 1986.

The journal is published by Elsevier and is currently edited by Eduardo Blumwald, Erich Grotewold, Liwen Jiang, David Wendehenne.

== Abstracting and indexing ==
The journal is abstracted and indexed in the following bibliographic databases:

- EMBiology
- BIOSIS
- Current Contents/Life Sciences
- Chemical Abstracts
- Current Contents/Agriculture, Biology & Environmental Sciences
- Reference Update
- PASCAL M
- Scopus

According to the Journal Citation Reports, the journal has a 2017 impact factor of 3.712.
