= List of Swiss architects =

Following is a list of notable Swiss architects:

== A–M ==
- Anton Aberle (1876–1953)
- Antonio Adamini (1792–1846)
- Karl Eduard Aeschlimann (1808–1893)
- Giocondo Albertolli (1743–1839)
- Adolphe Appia (1862–1928)
- Hans Wilhelm Auer (1847–1906)
- Erwin Friedrich Baumann (1890–1980)
- Alexander Bernardazzi (1831–1907)
- Giuseppe Bernardazzi (1816–1891)
- Melchior Berri (1801–1854)
- Max Bill (1908–1994)
- Alfred Friedrich Bluntschli (1842–1930)
- Roger Boltshauser (1964)
- Francesco Borromini (1599–1667)
- Mario Botta (born 1943)
- Markus Breitschmid (born 1966)
- Wilhelm Eduard Brodtbeck (1873–1957)
- Arnold Bürkli (1833–1894)
- Alberto Camenzind (1914–2004)
- Gion A. Caminada (born 1957)
- Giovanni Catenazzi (1660–1724)
- Christian Constantin
- Justus Dahinden (1925–2020)
- Andrea Deplazes (born 1960)
- Angela Deuber (born 1975)
- Roger Diener (born 1950)
- Max Dudler (born 1949)
- Fernand Dumas (1892–1956)
- Karl Egender (1897–1969)
- Hans Caspar Escher (1775–1859)
- Hans Fischli (1909–1989)
- Józef Fontana (1676-c. 1739)
- Albert Frey (1903–1998)
- Max Frisch (1911–1991)
- Joseph-Antoine Froelicher (1790–1866)
- Aurelio Galfetti (born 1936)
- Bruno Giacometti (1907–2012)
- Ernst Gisel (born 1922)
- Camille Graeser (1892–1980)
- Lux Guyer (1894–1955)
- Jacques Herzog (born 1950)
- Pierre Jeanneret (1896–1967)
- Constant Könz (born 1929)
- Iachen Ulrich Könz (1899–1980)
- Inès Lamunière (born 1954)
- Alphonse Laverrière (1872–1954)
- Le Corbusier (1887–1965)
- Charles l'Eplattenier (1874–1946)
- Gret Loewensberg (born 1943)
- Carlo Maderno (c. 1555–1629)
- Pierre de Meuron (born 1950)
- Hannes Meyer (1889–1954)
- Karl Moser (1860–1936)
- Werner Max Moser (1896–1970)

== N–Z ==
- Valerio Olgiati (born 1958)
- Giacomo Palearo (1520/30–1586)
- Alexandre Perregaux (1749–1808)
- Louis Perrier (1849–1913)
- Louis-Daniel Perrier (1818–1903)
- Hans Konrad Pestalozzi (1848–1909)
- Daniel Pfister (1808–1847)
- Adrien Pichard (1790–1841)
- Gaetano Matteo Pisoni (1713–1782)
- Paolo Antonio Pisoni (1738–1804)
- Joseph Plepp (1595–1642)
- Benjamin Recordon (1845–1938)
- Luigi Rusca (1762–1822)
- James of Saint George (1229–1308)
- Otto Rudolf Salvisberg (1882–1940)
- Hans Schmidt (1893–1972)
- Alexander von Senger (1880–1968)
- Carl Ahasver von Sinner (1754–1821)
- Luigi Snozzi (born 1932)
- Santino Solari (1575–1646)
- Ferdinand Stadler (1813–1870)
- Peter Steiger (born 1960)
- Flora Steiger-Crawford (1899–1991)
- Eduard Stettler (1803–1879)
- Eugen Stettler (1840–1913)
- Arnold Sutermeister (1830–1907)
- Anne Torcapel (1916–1988)
- Domenico Trezzini (c. 1670–1734)
- Bernard Tschumi (born 1944)
- Jean Tschumi (1904–1962)
- Maurice Turrettini (1878–1932)
- Livio Vacchini (1933–2007)
- Peter Vetsch (born 1943)
- Christian Waldvogel
- Hans Wittwer (1894–1952)
- Bruno Weber (1931–2011)
- Samuel Werenfels (1720–1800)
- Pierre Zoelly (1923–2003)
- Raphael Zuber (born 1973)
- Enrico Zuccalli (c. 1642–1724)
- Peter Zumthor (born 1943)

== See also ==
- List of architects
- List of Swiss people
