= Perregaux =

Perregaux is a surname. Notable people with the surname include:

- Alexandre Perregaux (1749–1808), Swiss architect, goldsmith, and ivory carver
- Alexandre Charles Perrégaux, French officer during the colonial conquest of Algeria
- François Perregaux (1834–1877), Swiss watchmaker and businessman
- Jean-Frédéric Perregaux, Swiss banker
- Jeanne-Marie-Françoise Perregaux (1777–1838), Swiss painter

== See also ==
- Girard-Perregaux, luxury Swiss watch manufacture
