= Augusto Giacometti =

Swiss painter

August Giacometti
- Born: 16 August 1877; Stampa, Grisons, Switzerland
- Died: 9 June 1947 (aged 69)
- Known for: Painter
- Movement: Art Nouveau, Symbolism

Augusto Giacometti (16 August 1877 – 9 June 1947) was a Swiss painter from Stampa, Grisons, cousin of Giovanni Giacometti who was the father of Alberto, Diego and Bruno Giacometti. He was prominent as a painter in the Art Nouveau and Symbolism movements, one of the first abstract painters, for his work in stained glass, as a proponent of murals and a designer of popular posters.

He finished (among others) stained glass windows in both of the most important churches of Zürich, Grossmünster and Fraumünster, as well as the inner decoration of the so-called Waisenhaus Zürich.

From 1909 to 1913, Augusto Giacometti was a great inspiration for the Czech-born sculptor Helen Zelezny-Scholz.

A two-day hiking trail connects most of the locations of the family in Val Bregaglia.

== Life and work ==
Augusto was part of the successful Giacometti dynasty of painters. He grew up near the home and studio of his cousin Giovanni Giacometti, and devoted himself to painting from a young age. After completing his training as an art teacher at the Zurich University of the Arts between 1894 and 1897, he moved to Paris to study under Eugène Grasset from 1897 to 1901. Following periods of residence in Florence and Zurich, he settled down in Zurich in 1915.

In 1917, Giacometti came to know the Dadaists Tristan Tzara, Marcel Janco, Sophie Taeuber-Arp, and Hugo Ball. He took part in the 8th Dada-Soirée in the Zurich merchants' hall and became a member of the group of artists "Das Neue Leben" (1918–1920). Known for his decorations in holy arts and his floral subjects, in 1919 Giacometti was initiated to the Swiss Freemasonry at Zürich.

With the realization of his design for the entrance hall (now known as Giacometti-Halle) of the police station at Waisenhaus Zürich between 1923 and 1925, Giacometti accomplished one of his most important works. The great recognition he received for this work paved the way for him to further important commissions.

In 1929, he created the colourful glass windows in the east wall of the Protestant church in Frauenfeld, in 1933 the choral windows of Grossmünster in Zurich, in 1937 the choral windows of the village church of Adelboden, and in 1945 a stained-glass window of Fraumünster.

He was one of the first painters of the 20th century to take steps into non-representational painting; his abstract paintings reflect his exhaustive study of the characteristics and rules of colour. His epitaph reads Qui riposa il maestro dei colori, "here lies the master of colour".

Giacometti influenced the German painter August Babberger greatly in both his style and his choice of subjects.

Giacometti's works

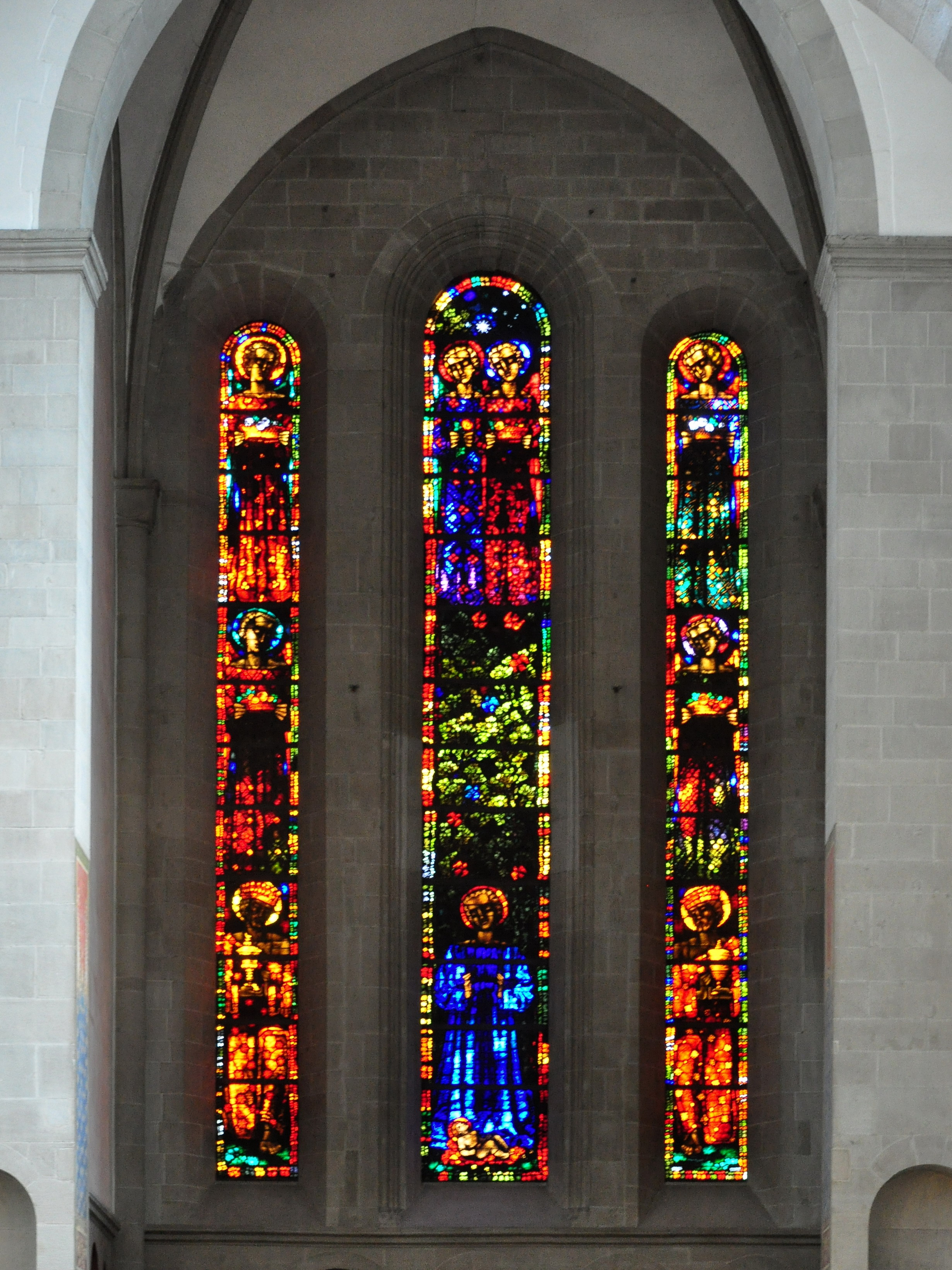
Giacometti's window in Grossmünster (1933)

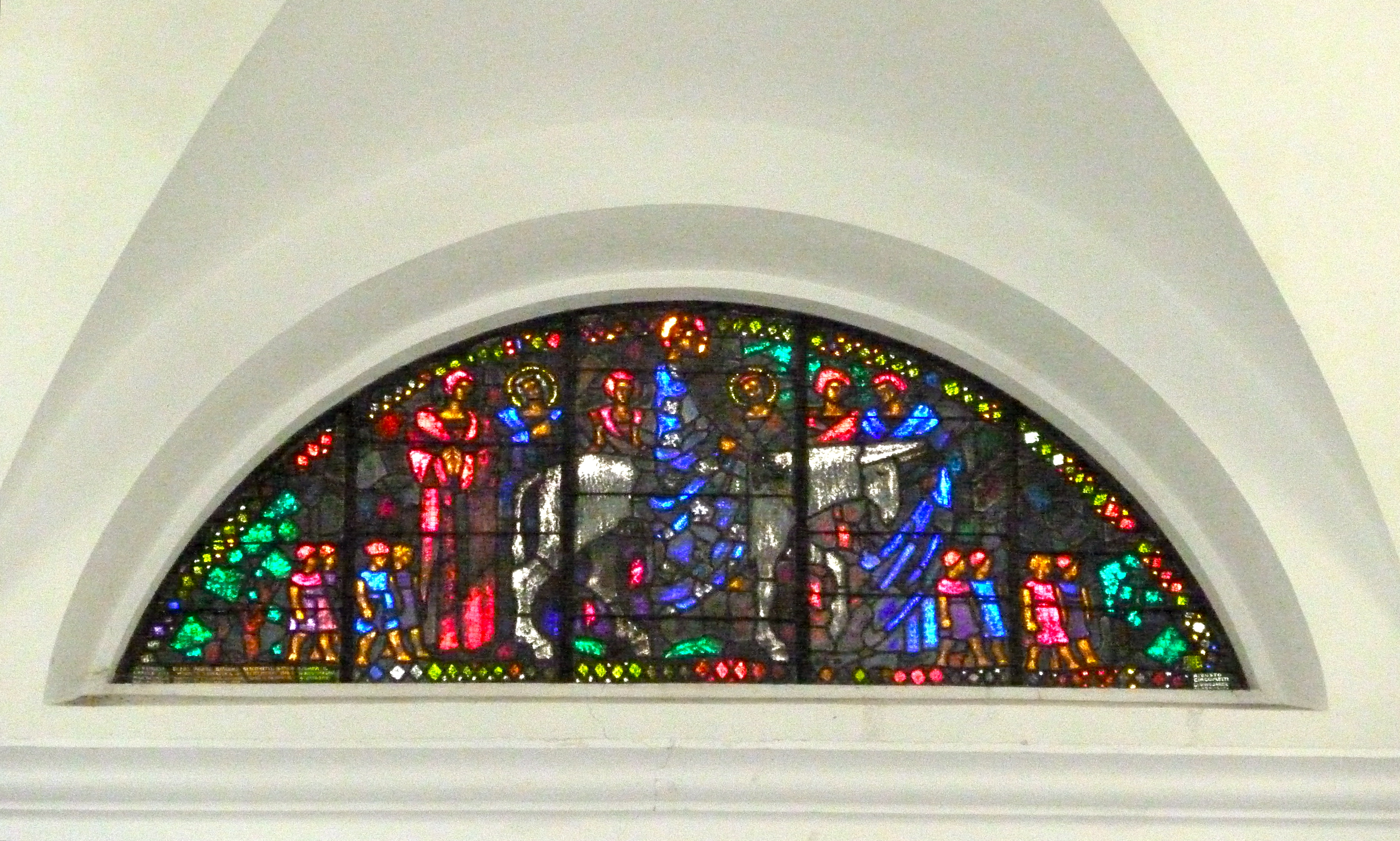
Window of Kirche San Giorgio in Borgonovo, where Giacometti is buried

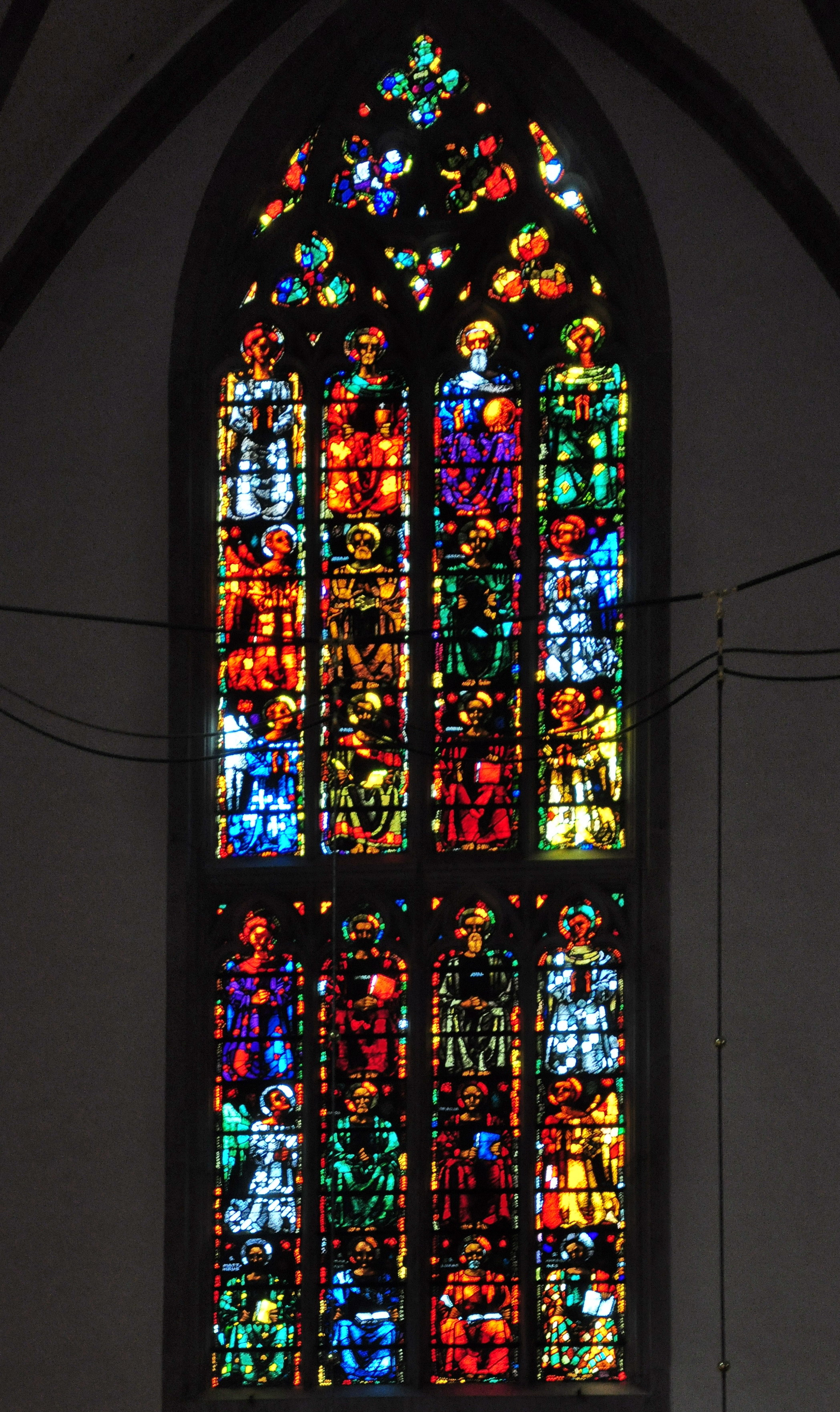
Window of Fraumünster Das himmlische Paradies (1945)

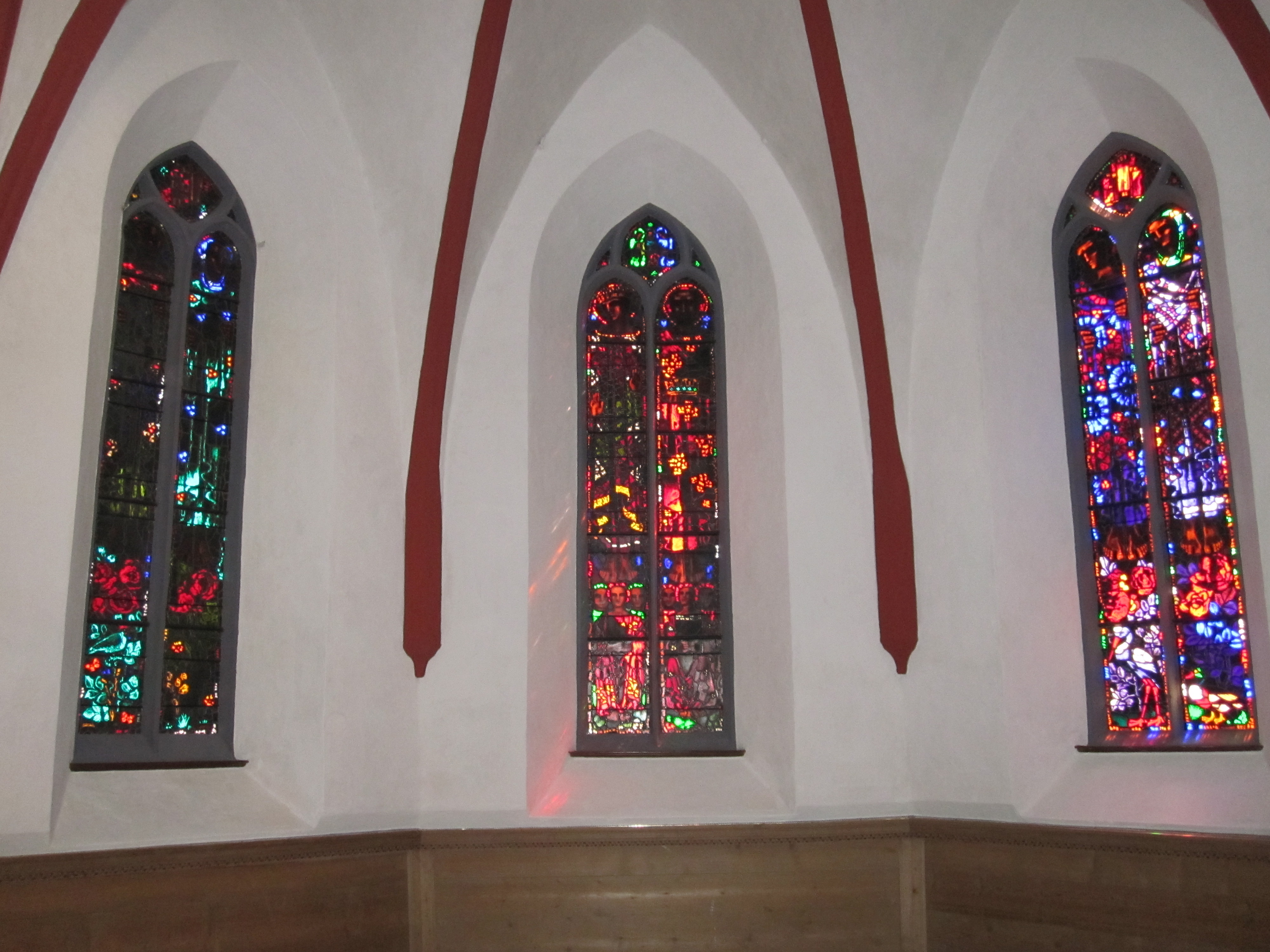
Church of St. Johann in Davos

== Exhibitions ==
- 2014/2015: Color and I. Augusto Giacometti, Museum of Fine Arts Bern
