= Benjamin Recordon =

Swiss architect (1845–1938)

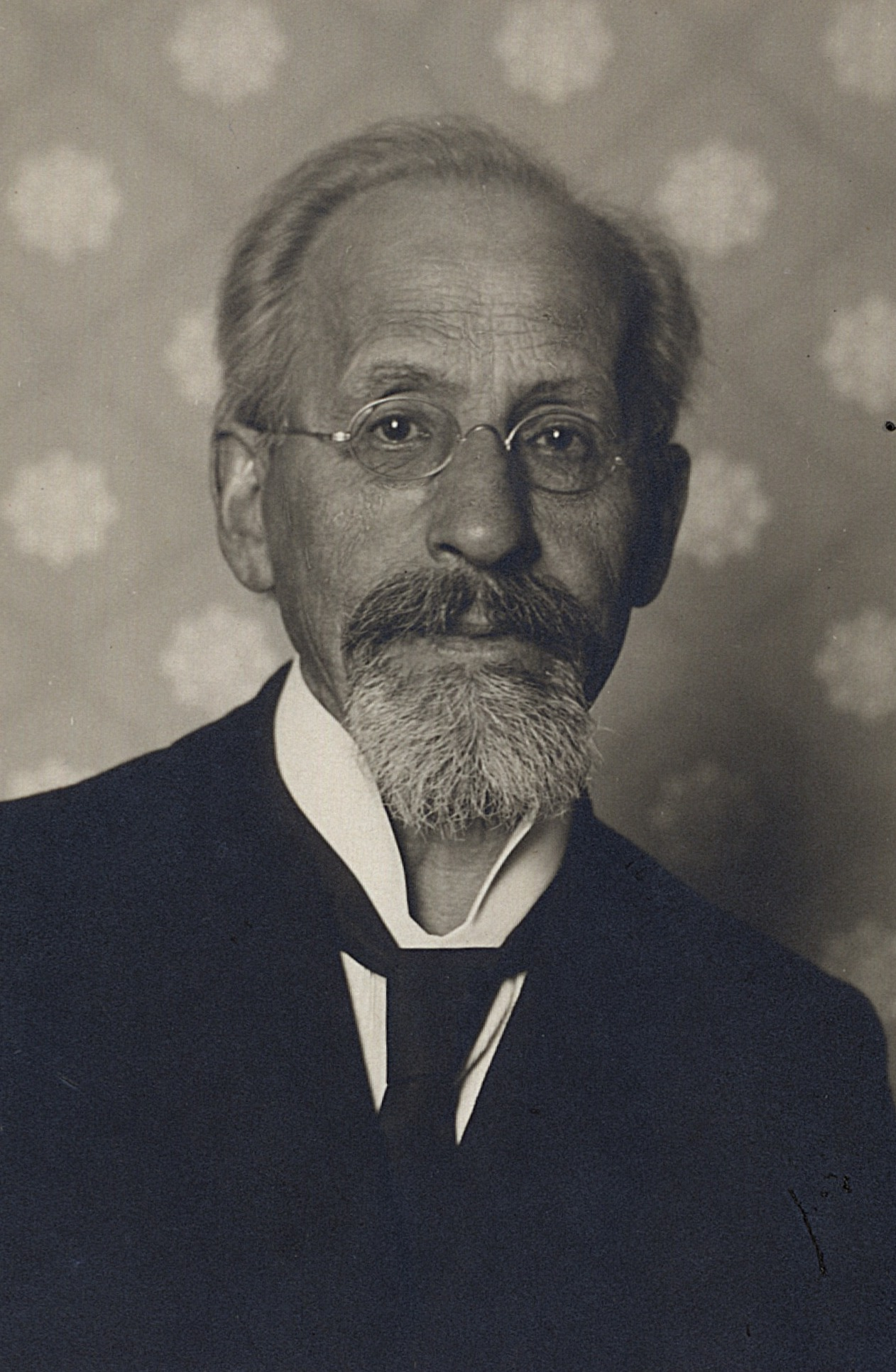
- Benjamin Recordon, c. 1910
- Born: 2 September 1845; Vevey, Switzerland
- Died: 19 July 1938 (aged 92); Rances, Switzerland
- Occupation: architect

Benjamin Recordon (2 September 1845 – 19 July 1938 Vevey) was a Swiss architect.

== Early life and education ==
He was the son of Charles François Gabriel, a pastor, and Louise Catherine Walther.

Recordon attended the Realschule in Basel and then served as an architectural intern to Samuel Késer-Doret in Vevey. In 1865–1868, he studied and worked with Gottfried Semper at the Swiss Federal Institute of Technology in Zurich, then with Léo Châtelain in Neuchâtel.

== Architectural career ==
Between 1873 and 1875, he was in charge of the construction of the College des jeunes filles in Vevey. He won third prize in the 1877 design competition for the Palais de Justice of Esplanade of Montbenon in Lausanne, but his design was ultimately used for the structure, which was completed in 1886. In 1889, he took fifth place in the international competition to design the Palais de Rumine in Lausanne.

In Zurich, he built the machinery laboratory of the Ecole Polytechnique (1896–1900) and the French Evangelical Church (1900–1902).

== Academic career ==
He was professor of stereotomy at the Lausanne Academy (1881–1890), then professor of civil construction at ETH Zurich (1890–1916), where his students included Robert Maillart and Gustav Gull.

== Personal life ==
He was married to Marie-Olympe-Adèle Cannette, who was French.

== See also ==
- List of Swiss architects
