= Oetenbach nunnery =

Dominican nunnery in Zürich

Coordinates: 47.3741°N 8.5404°E

Oetenbach was a Dominican nunnery in the medieval municipality of Zürich in Switzerland. Oetenbach was named after the small stream of the same name at its first location at Zürichhorn, situated outside of the European Middle Ages town walls, but moved to the present Sihlbühl. The nunnery was abolished on the occasion of the Reformation in Zürich – the Waisenhaus building is its only remaining structure, now the headquarters of Stadtpolizei Zürich.

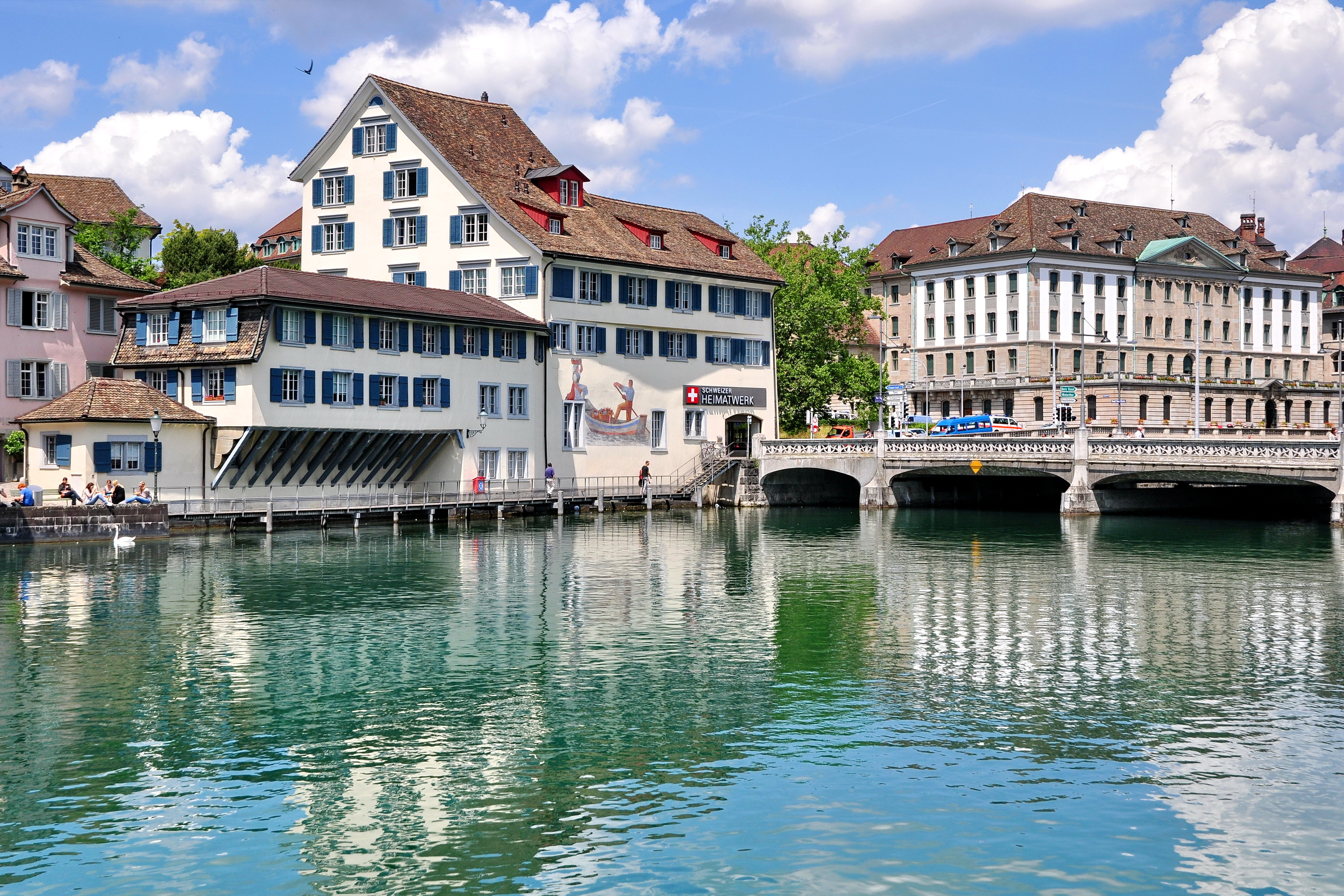
The area of the abolished nunnery towards Uraniastrasse, as seen from Limmatquai, Schipfe and Lindenhof to the left, the Waisenhaus building to the right.

== Location ==
The Oetenbach nunnery was first mentioned in 1237 AD at its first location at the present Zürichhorn. Because the swampy area at the Oetenbach stream was a bad place for the construction of a permanently inhabited convent, some decades later, it was built on the northern slope Sihlbühl of the present Lindenhof hill.

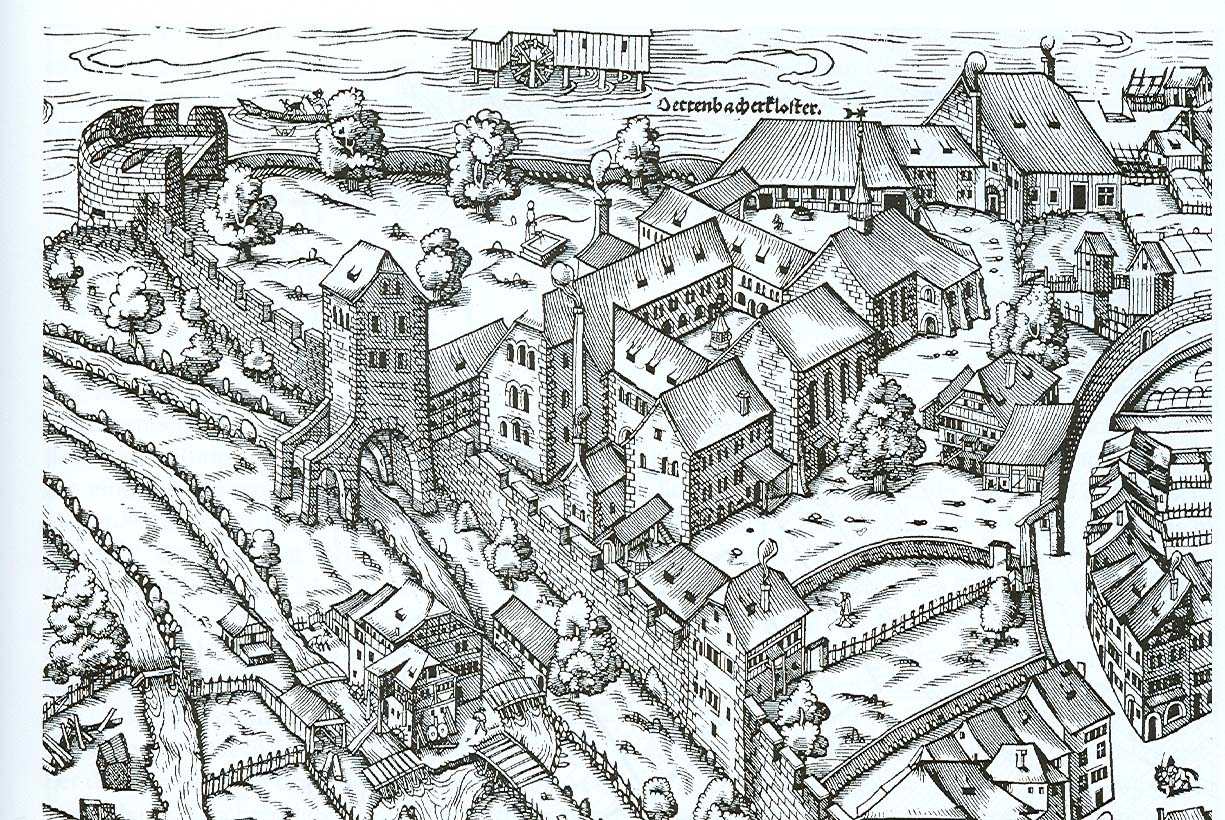
Oetenbach at the Lindenhof hill on the so-called Murerplan map of 1576

On the so-called Murerplan map of 1576, the central Lindenhof–Sihlbühl hill area is illustrated, surrounded by the Limmat river – at the top, in fact in the east and not in the north – the Fröschengraben and Schanzengraben moat to the right, and some meandering streams of the Sihl river to the right. There are also shown the watermills, provided by the nunneries in Zürich at the location of the present Rathausbrücke and southernly Münsterbrücke and former Gedecktes Brüggli bridges over the Limmat river, an old privilege dating back to the foundation of the Fraumünster abbey located at the present Münsterhof square.

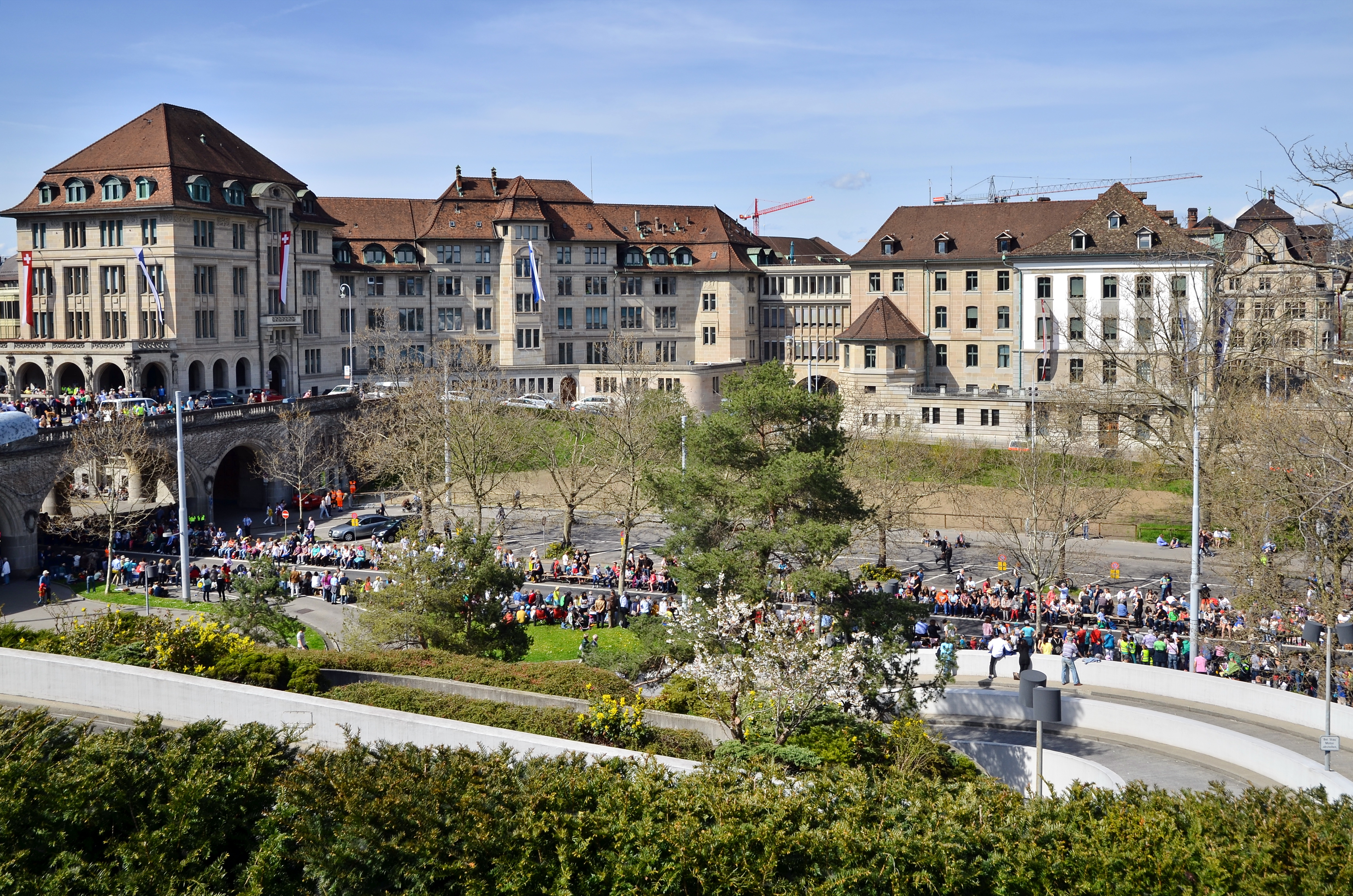
The Sihlbühl respectively Uranianstrasse area towards the Waisenhaus Zürich building

== History ==
Oetenbach was named after the small stream of the same name at its first location at Zürichhorn, as today named Wildbach respectively Hornbach. The nuns changed the unhappy chosen location of the former convent to today's Oetenbachgasse in 1286. The founding was supported by the House of Rapperswil, namely by Elisabeth von Rapperswil, who like her mother and father before, was an ally of the city of Zürich and had the citizenship (Burgrecht) of the municipality at the northwesterly end of Zürichsee. Thus, her daughter Cecilia von Homberg (* probably before 1300; † after 1320) became the prioress of the Dominican nunnery, which promoted its further development, and her brother Wernher von Homberg donated the Our Lady Chapel in 1320. Also probably Johann I von Habsburg-Laufenburg, son of Countess Elisabeth by first marriage, may have supported the nunnery as being in close friendship to the Predigerkloster which got in the 1340s asylum in Rapperswil. So the nunnery spread at the location where the present Urania underground parking facilities were built in the 1960s, and also was forced by the city government (Rat) of Zürich to enforce the northwesterly fortifications of Zürich, namely the so-called Oetenbach bulwark. The irrigated grave system of medieval Zürich, consisting of Fröschengraben, the outer Sihlgraben and the intermediate town wall was first mentioned in 1258 AD as niuwer graben, and on 23 June 1292, a law to regulate by decree was sealed by the city of Zürich and the convent, related to the section of the town wall at the Sihlbühl area. On the wall gardens, probably the area between Fröschengraben, Sihlgraben and Schanzengraben, a house is mentioned in 1346. Over the decades, the time accumulating sludge was periodically dug out by day labourers or in forced labour to process. The excavation was used to fertilize the fields of the Oetenbach nunnery.

Because of his great appointment district in the province of the order Dominican Teutonia order, the Predigerkloster at Neumarkt opposite of the Limmat river, influenced almost throughout German-speaking Switzerland. Therefore, the Predigern parish church was in charge of the pastoral care of the Oetenbach nunnery, as well as of the urban communities of the women Beguines, who lived nearby the Dominican and Franciscan mendicant orders in separate quarters outside the convents.

The Oetenbach nunnery was dissolved on the occasion of the Reformation in Zürich, and its property was passed over to the city government in 1525. It served thereafter as part of the city fortifications, prison and asylum. Except for the later-built Waisenhaus, all convent buildings were demolished when the Uraniastrasse was built in the 1900s.

== Oetenbachbollwerk ==
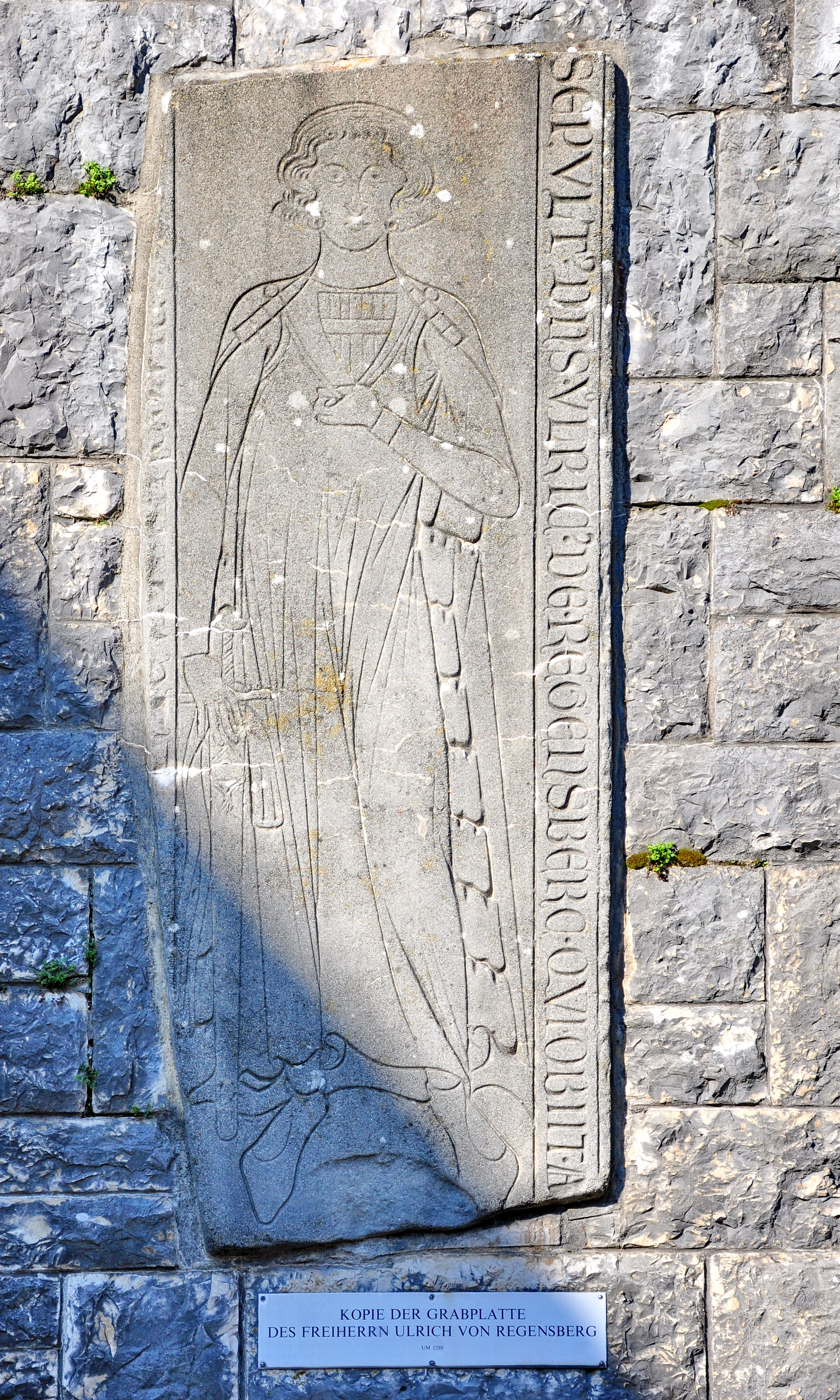
replic of the gravestone of Ulrich I von Regensberg at the Regensberg Castle

The Oetenbachbollwerk was a bastion of the fortifications, and was built under the supervision of Balthasar Keller in 1532. The stronghold replaced a wooden mounting in the garden of the Oetenbach convent and had to secure the western town wall and the gate at the Limmat River. In 1642 the bulwark was covered, and in 1764 the adjoining Waisenhaus building was provided as a storage room and economics building. In 1903 the bastion was broken as the last construction of the city's fortifications. Numerous finds came to light, including the gravestone of Ulrich I von Regensberg, which was misused as a loophole cornice of the bulwark.

== Gedecktes Brüggli ==
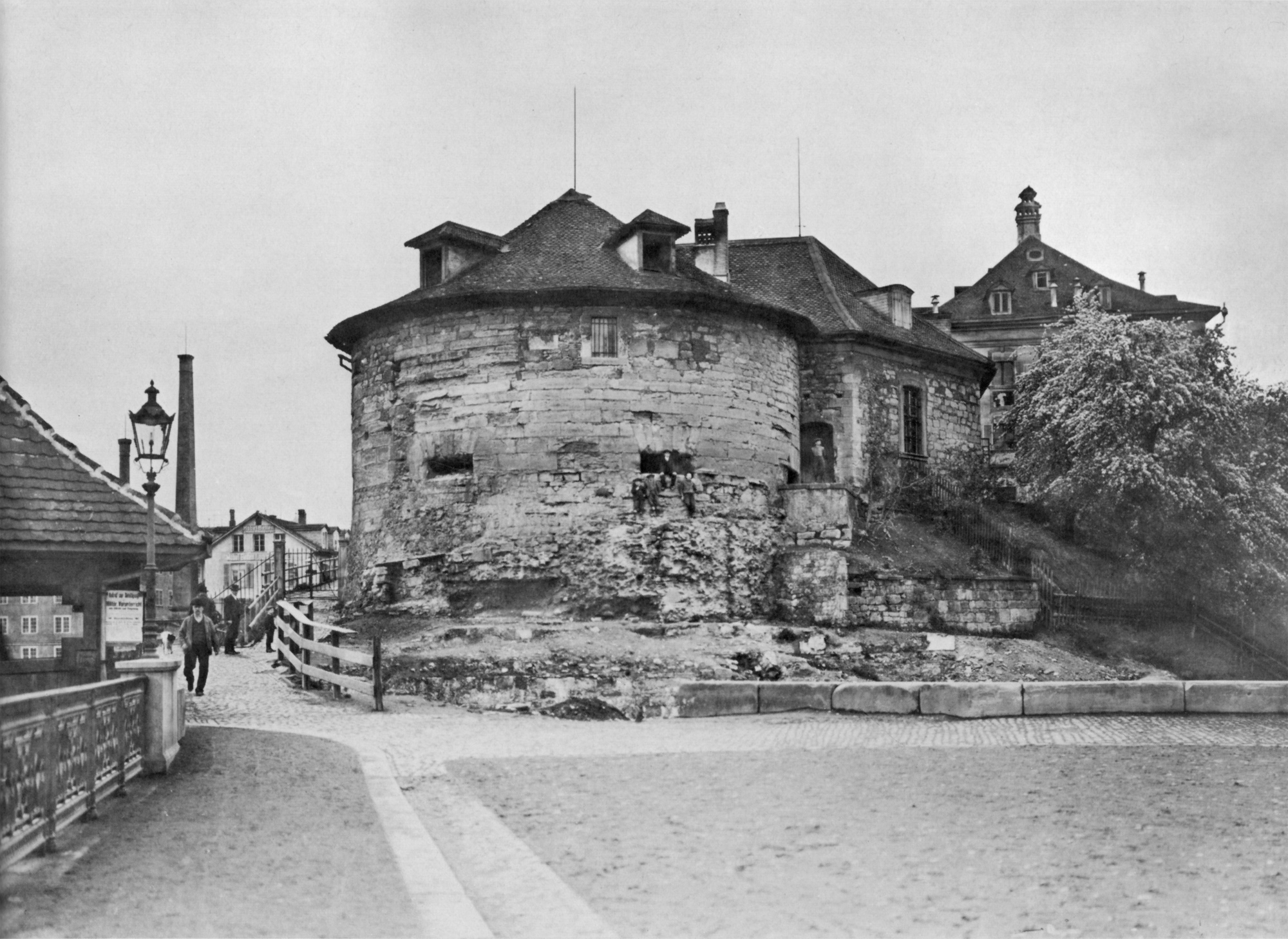
Oetenbach bulwark and Gedecktes Brüggli in 1903

The so-called Gedecktes Brüggli served as a pedestrian bridge, was very popular, but was broken in 1950. As its Swiss-German name explains, it was a covered wooden bridge that was created by architect Vögtlin over an arm of the Limmat river in 1689. Measuring about 17.5 metres in length, it connected the lower Mühlesteg and Papierwerd between present Limmatquai and Bahnhofquai nearby Bahnhofbrücke Zürich. At the site of the then-mill lower ridge at Papierwerd – a former river island that later was used as the site of a paper mill – today's Mühlesteg pedestrian bridge was erected.

== Wainscoting of the dormitory ==
After the death of the last Oetenbach nun in 1566, the grain master of the city of Zürich moved his offices to the east wing of the dormitory, which was henceforth referred to as Kornamtshaus. It may be assumed that the grain master occupied the principal rooms, including the two wood-carved rooms at the northern end of the wing that probably served as the apartment of the prioress. As well as the so-called Äbtissinnenstuben of the Fraumünster abbey, the last resident Katharina von Zimmern, thanks to their uninterrupted use and appreciation of the institutions established there, remained in use until a few years before the demolition of the monastic buildings occurred. In 1894 the wood-carved wainscoting were transferred to the Swiss National Museum.

== Waisenhaus ==
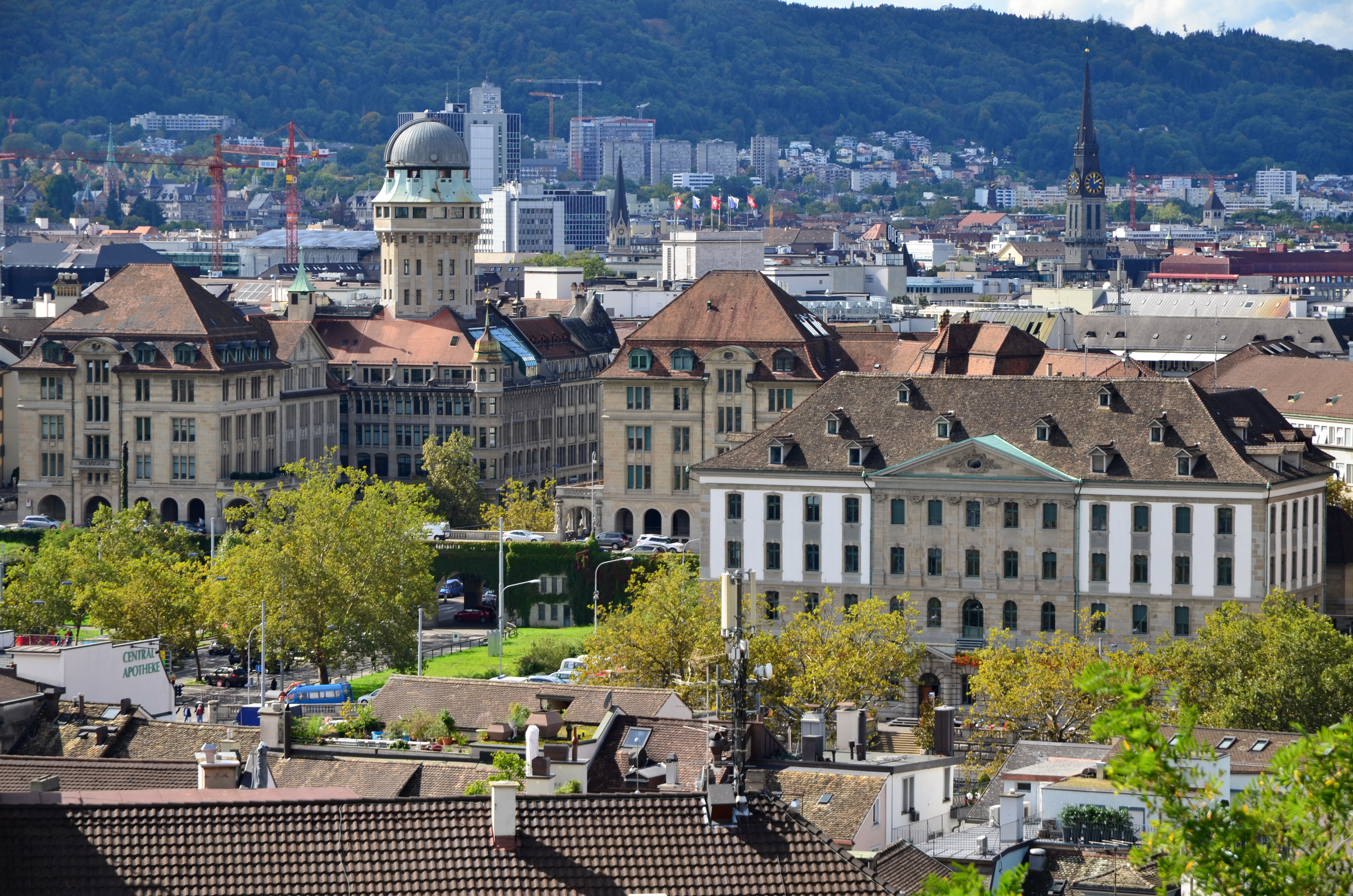
Amtshaus building complex and Urania Sternwarte, Sihlbühl hill to the left, Waisenhaus to the right at the present Bahnhofquai.

The last remaining building of the nunnery is the former Waisenhaus building, thus not one of the former convent buildings, but now used as the headquarters of the city police Stadtpolizei Zürich. After the Reformation in Zürich, the city government took over the monastic buildings for new uses. Among others, the buildings were used between 1637 and 1639 as an orphanage and a prison. In 1771 the orphans were held in the newly built orphanage in the former monastery's garden. The former orphanage today serves as the official Stadthaus I at the present Waisenhausstrasse, meaning orphary lane.

== See also ==
- Waisenhaus Zürich

== Literature ==
- Dölf Wild: Stadtmauern. Ein neues Bild der Stadtbefestigungen Zürichs (= Stadtgeschichte und Städtebau in Zürich. Schriften zu Archäologie, Denkmalpflege und Stadtplanung. 5). Schrift zur Ausstellung im Haus zum Haus zum Rech, Zürich, 6. Februar bis 30. April 2004. Amt für Städtebau, Baugeschichtliches Archiv, Zürich 2004, ISBN 3-905384-05-1.
- Christine Barraud Wiener and Peter Jezler: Die Stadt Zürich I. Stadt vor der Mauer, mittelalterliche Befestigung und Limmatraum. In: Die Kunstdenkmäler des Kantons Zürich, Wiese Verlag, Basel 1999, ISBN 978-3-9061-3171-9
- Sigmund Widmer: Zürich. Eine Kulturgeschichte. Volume 3. Artemis, Zürich 1975–1986, ISBN 3-7608-0399-7.
