= Waisenhaus Zürich =

Waisenhaus
- Waisenhaus (German)
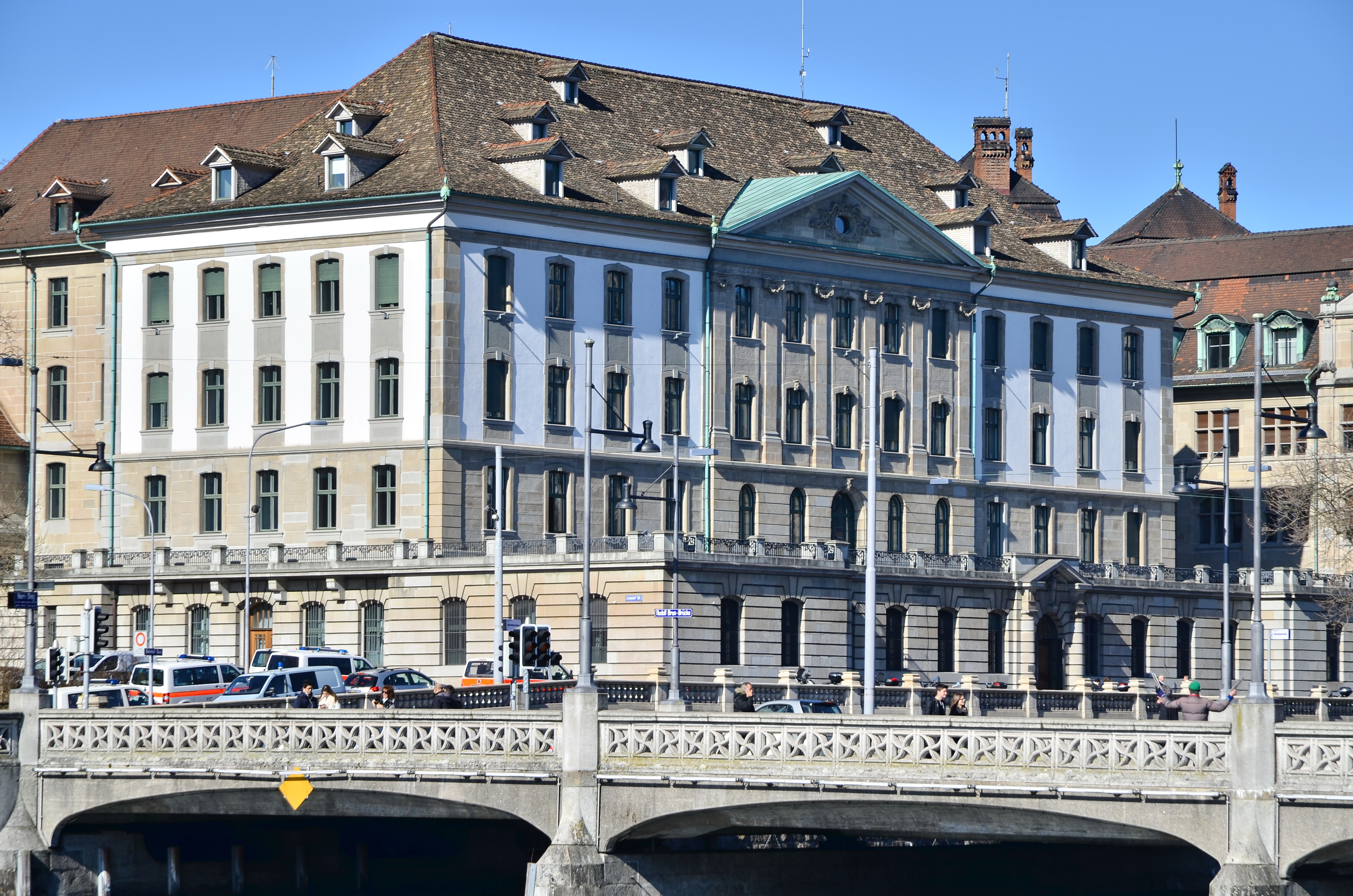
- Waisenhaus as seen from Limmatquai
- Interactive map of Waisenhaus
- 47°22′22.6″N 8°32′30.4″E
- Location: Bahnhofquai 3, 8003 Zurich

History
- Built: before 1521, rebuilt 1911–1914

Site notes
- Architect: Gustav Gull (1914)
- Governing body: City of Zurich

The Waisenhaus (lit. 'orphanage'), or Amthaus I, is the last remaining building of the Oetenbach nunnery in Zurich, Switzerland, and today houses the city police department.

== Location ==
The Waisenhaus building is situated at Bahnhofquai 3 near Bahnhofbrücke and Zürich Hauptbahnhof. Built outside of the historical core of the medieval town of Zurich, previously the Celtic-Roman Turicum, the former Zucht- und Waisenhaus ("penitentiary and orphanage") is the last remaining structure of the Oetenbach nunnery at the Lindenhof-Silhlbühl hill on the western shore of the Limmat river.

== History ==
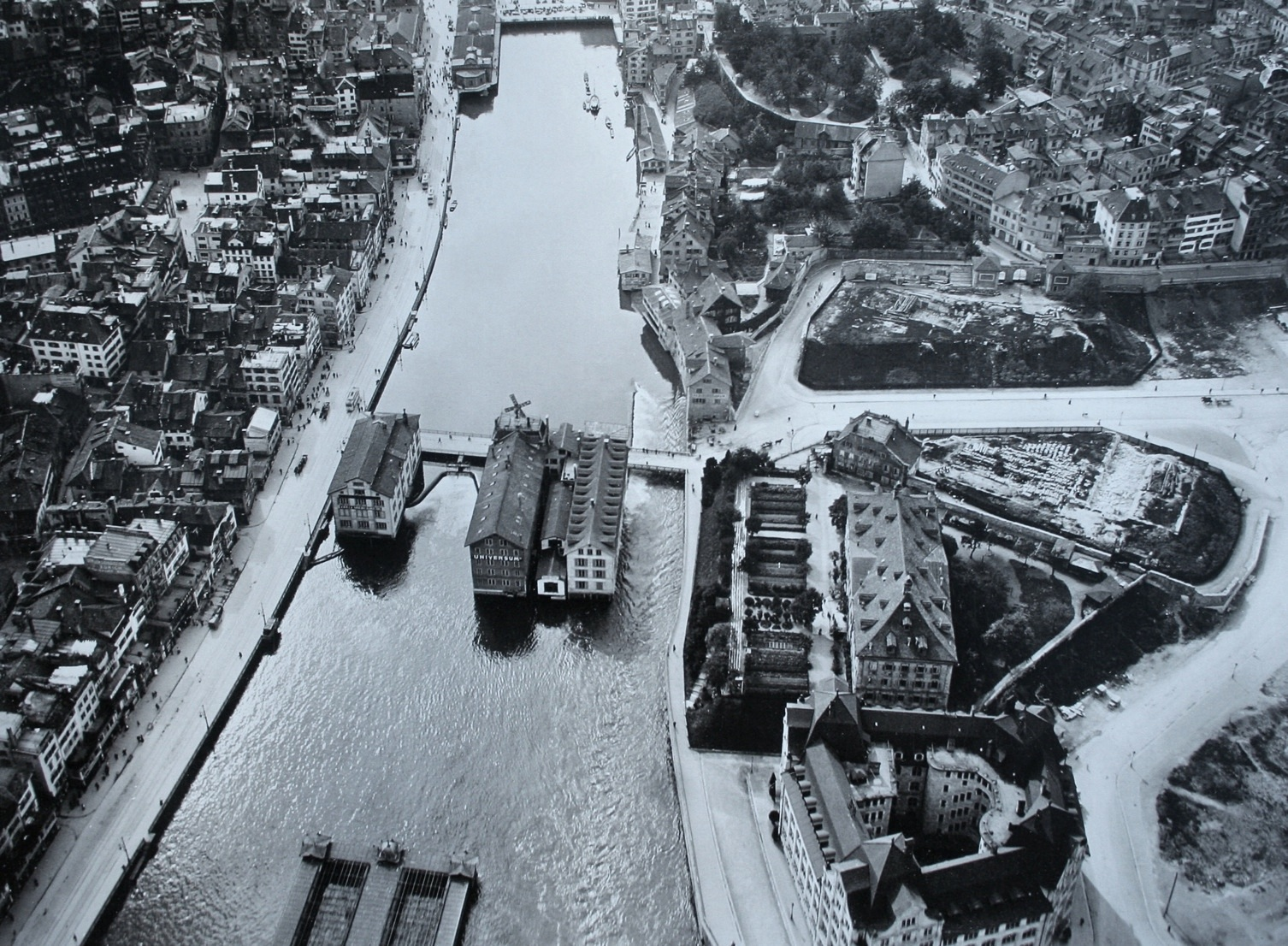
Limmatquai and Lindenhof-Sihlbühl area, Gmüessbrügg on the upper side, and the Waisenhaus on the Limmat shore in the foreground. Aerial photography by Eduard Spelterini around 1909.

After the Reformation in Zurich, the city government took over the monastic buildings for new uses. To manage the income of the former convent, the former administration building was held as Oetenbacheramt housing the former wine cellar. In 1601 the building was extensively remodeled and equipped with stepped gables, and as police barracks, in 1872 the remains of wall paintings were discovered. After a renovation in 1735 the south facade was in 1776 redesigned with a simple baroque, and an additional ceiling was set up and a second floor. From 1799 to 1802 the church buildings were among others used as a military hospital. Already between 1637 and 1639, the ground floor was used as an orphanage in the north, in the west wing a prison was set up in the former dormitories of the nuns. In 1771 the orphans were held in the newly built orphanage in the former monastery's garden, and the north and west wings extensively needed to be rebuilt as a penitentiary and workhouse, separating the prison from the new orphanage. The former orphanage today serves as the official Stadthaus I at the present Waisenhausstrasse, meaning orphanage lane. When the remaining buildings of the Oetenbach nunnery were broken, the occasion was not used by the archaeologists to secure finds of the Oppidum Lindenhof. In 1903 the adjoint Oetenbachbollwerk bastion was broken as the last structure of the city's fortifications. The subsequent so-called Gedecktes Brüggli served as a pedestrian bridge, and was broken in 1953.

== Architecture ==
The buildings were rebuilt for a last time between 1868 and 1878, and probably the present Giacometti entrance area in 1890, and the last original structures of the Oetenbach nunnery may have been removed by as original 1901 plans by Ferdinand Curti and Hermann Fietz suggest.

The lack of space and the separation of prisoners by criminal categories ordered by the then new criminal law, initiated the design and construction of a new detention centre for modern principles. So, in the night of 8 to 9 October 1901, the prisoners were moved to the new prison Pöschwies in Regensdorf. In the same year, the remaining monastery area passed into the possession of the city of Zurich. The remaining Oetenbach building was broken in 1901/02, but the Waisenhaus was preserved in favour of an administrative centre, that in 1904/1905 took place at the former Sihlbühl which then was separated by the easterly Uraniastrasse and the building complex housing the Urania Sternwarte.

The building remained unused until 1911, and when the Stadthaus was rebuilt and the neighbouring Amthaus buildings were erected by Gustav Gull it became the present headquarters of the Stadtpolizei Zürich, the city police department.

== Giacometti Halle ==
Gustav Gull integrated the Stadhaus building between 1911 and 1914 in the Urania complex, and the former cellar at the entrance floor of the Waisenhaus building was redesigned on behalf of Emil Klöti by Augusto Giacometti between 1923 and 1925 with vault and wall paintings, which are considered as a work of art of national importance. On the occasion of the total renovation of the office building, the so-called Giacometti Halle was extensively renovated from 1985 to 2000.

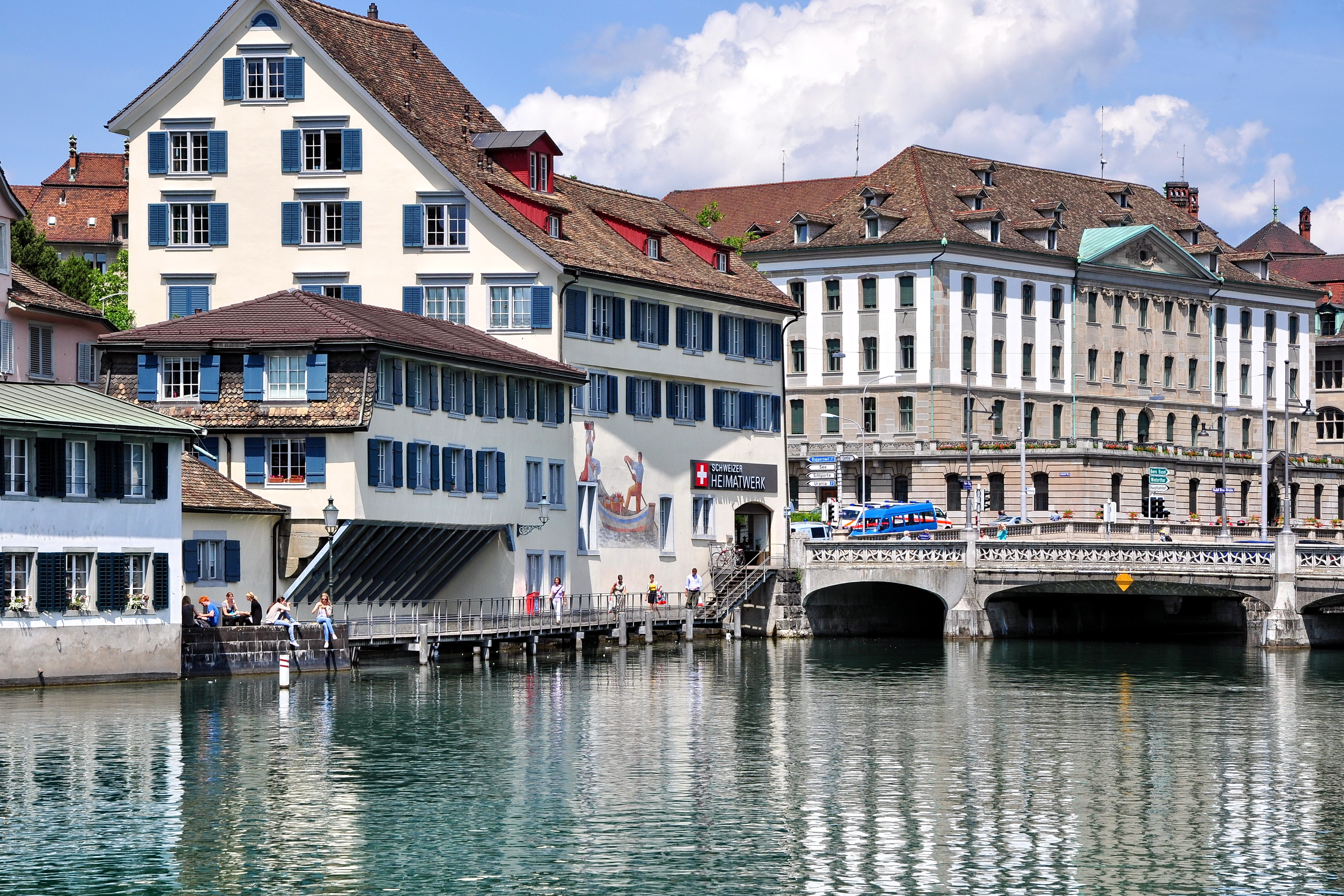
Sihlbühl area of the former Oetenbach nunnery

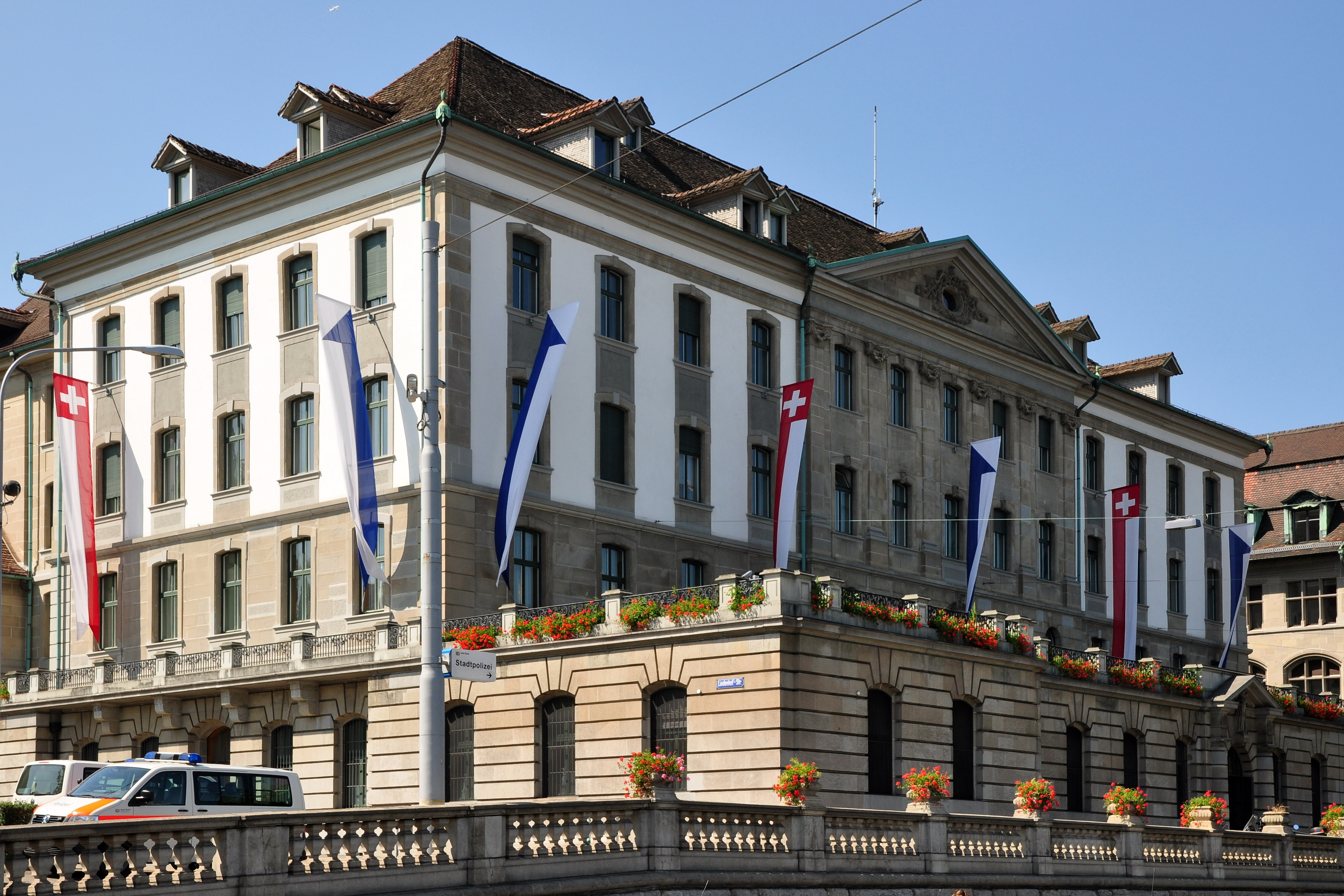

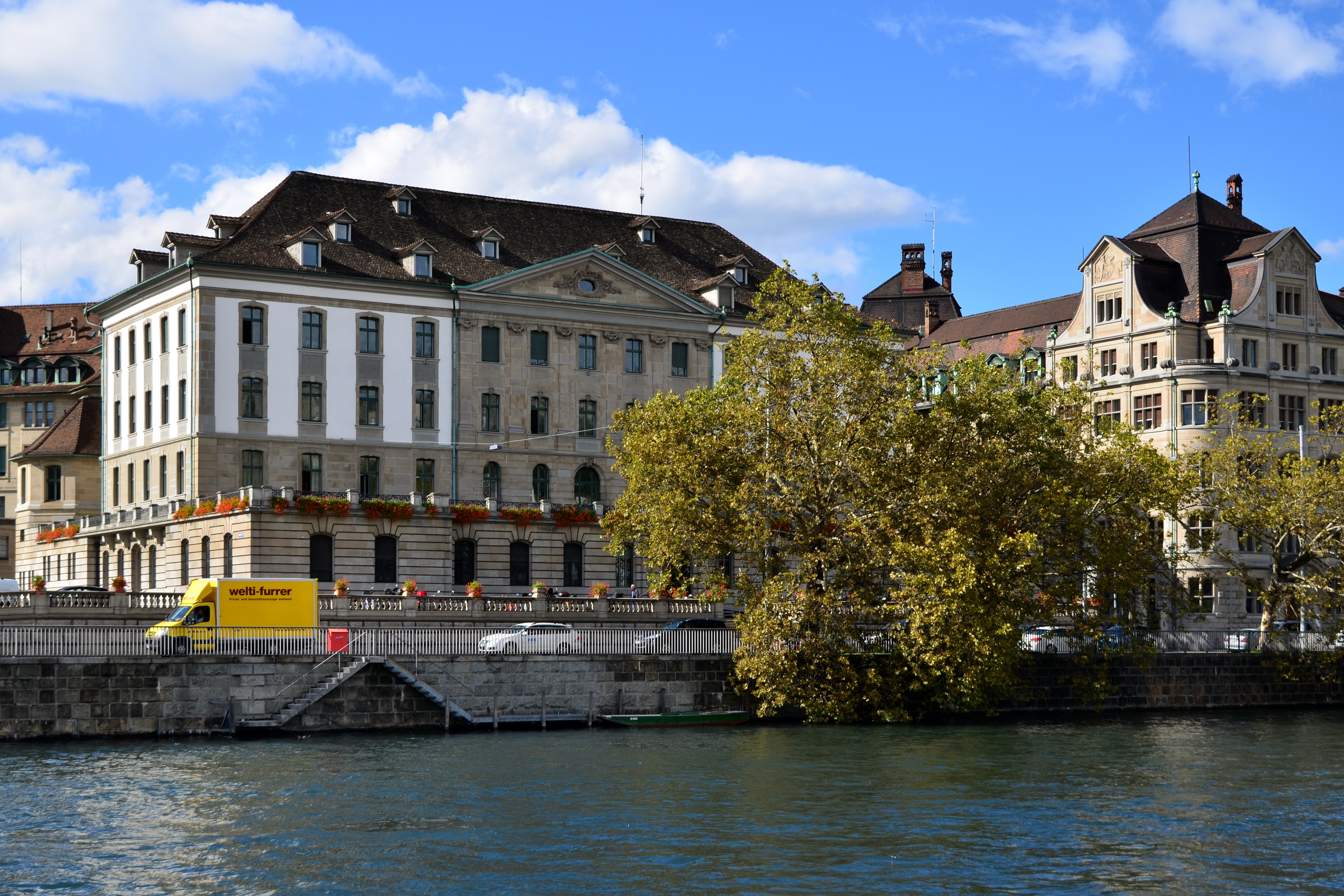

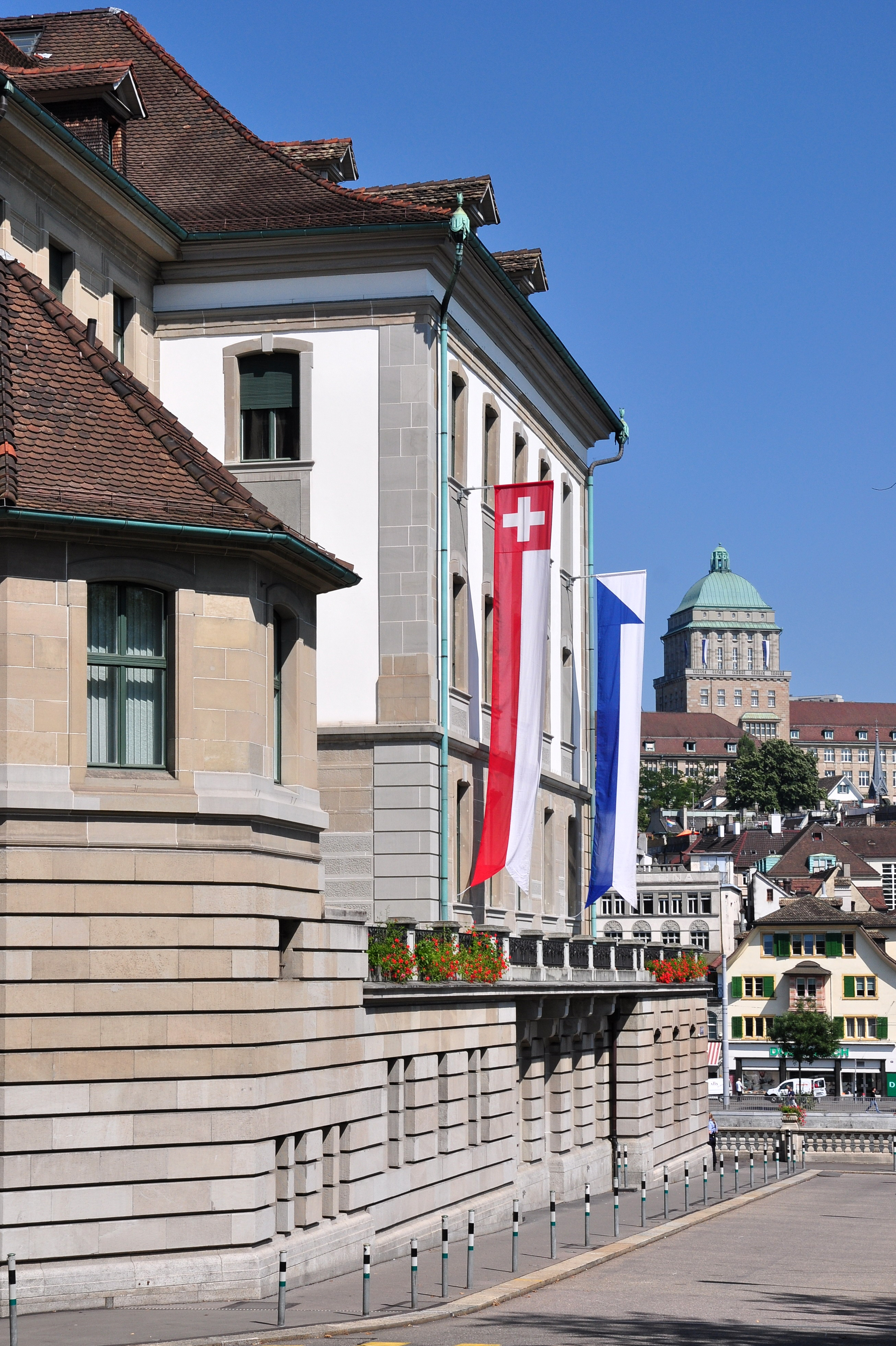

== Cultural heritage of national importance ==
The building and Augusto Giacometti's fresco are, as part of the building ensemble in that area, listed in the Swiss inventory of cultural property of national and regional significance as a Class A object of national importance.

== Literature ==
- Regine Abegg: Von den mittelalterlichen Klöstern zur Stadtverwaltung. Fraumünsterabtei und Oetenbachkloster. Published by Baugeschichtliches Archiv, Neumarkt, Zurich 2009.
