= Gustav Gull =

Swiss architect (1858–1942)

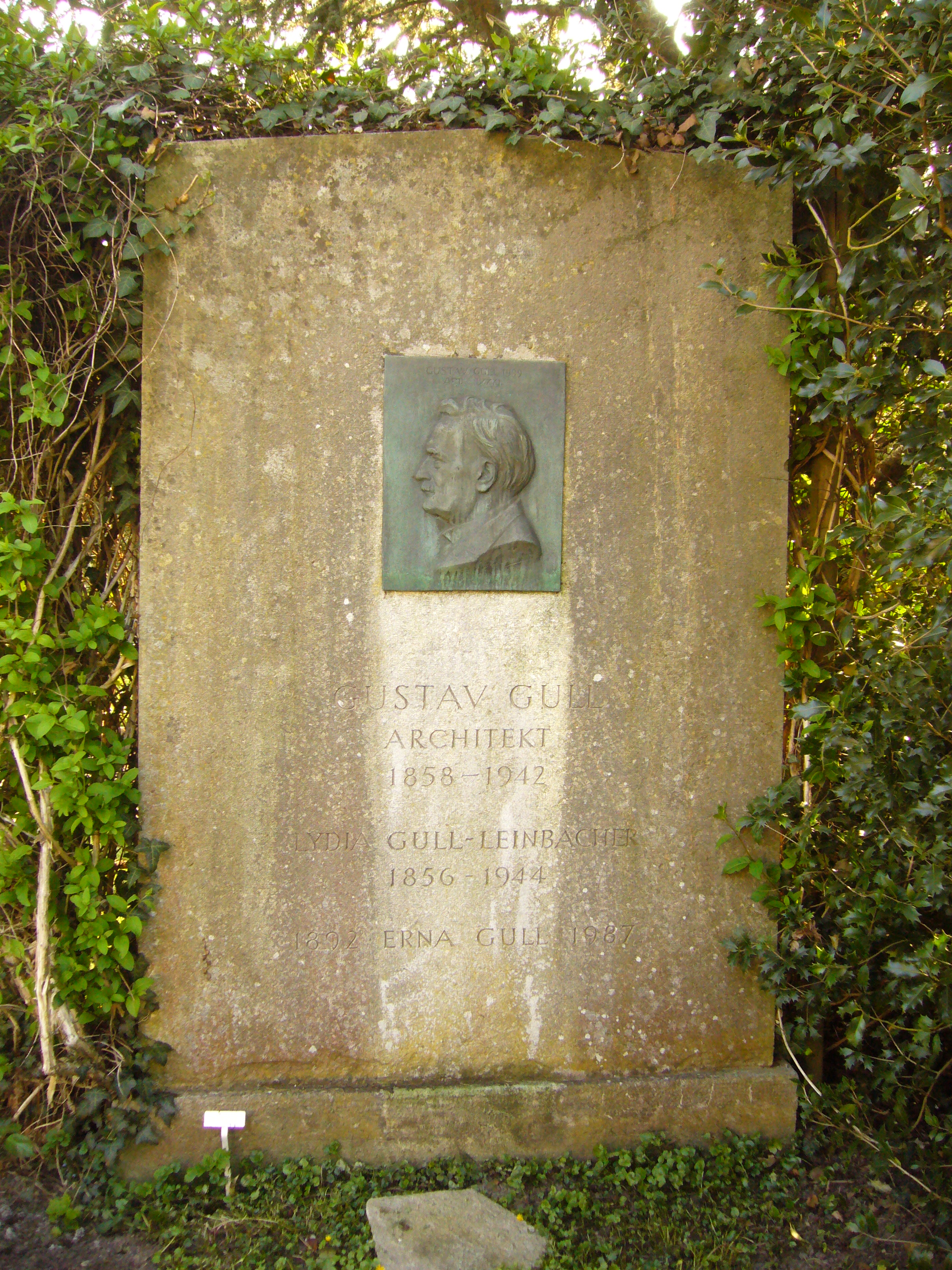
- Gustav Gull burial headstone
- Born: December 7, 1858; Altstetten, Switzerland
- Died: June 10, 1942 (aged 83); Zurich, Switzerland
- Burial place: Zurich, Switzerland
- Education: Polytechnic of Zürich, École des Arts Décoratifs in Geneva
- Occupation: architect
- Known for: master builder in Zurich
- Notable work: designed the Swiss National Museum
- Spouse: Lydia Gull-Leinbacher
- Children: 1
- Parents: Rudolf Gottlieb (father); Anna Gull (née Fries) (mother)

Gustav Gull (December 7, 1858 – June 10, 1942) was a Swiss architect. He designed the Swiss National Museum for which marked a breakthrough in his architectural career.

== Life ==
Gull was born on 7 December 1858, in Altstetten, to Rudolf Gottlieb and Anna Gull (née Fries). He studied architecture at the Polytechnic of Zürich attended courses at the École des Arts Décoratifs in Geneva from 1879 to 1880. This was followed by an internship with Benjamin Recordon in Lausanne until 1882. After a trip to Italy (1883–1884), he first entered into a partnership with Conrad von Muralt, with whom he built the main post office in Lucerne, the Lavater schoolhouse in Zurich, among other things. In 1890, he received the first commission from the city of Zurich to draw up a plan for a Swiss National Museum. From 1895 to 1900, he was a master builder in Zurich, then he worked as professor of architecture at the Zurich Polytechnic until 1929.

Gull died on 10 June 1942, aged 83, in Zurich, and is buried in Zürich.

== Career ==
He designed the main post office of Lucerne. With a few exceptions, his buildings are concentrated in Zürich.

He designed the Swiss National Museum, and was involved in the construction of the Urania complex in Zürich that comprises Amtshaus I-IV at the Lindenhof hill, as well as the Stadthaus Zürich at Münsterhof, Urania Sternwarte, and Waisenhaus Zürich at Lindenhof hill, and the tower of Predigerkirche Zürich that was built after Gull's plans by Friedrich Wehrli.

Another of Gull's buildings is the Zurich Stadthaus, for whose construction the northern part of the Kratzquartier and the Fraumünster monastery were demolished; Gull integrated the rest of the cloister into the inner courtyard of the Stadthaus.
