= Bernardazzi =

Bernardazzi is a surname. Notable people with the surname include:

- Alexander Bernardazzi (1831–1907), Russian architect
- Giuseppe Bernardazzi (1816–1891), Swiss architect
