= Giuseppe Bernardazzi =

Swiss architect and painter

Giuseppe Raimondo Bernardazzi (13 August 1816, Pambio – 15 January 1891, Pambio) was a Swiss architect and painter.

== Biography ==
His father was the architect, Vincenzo Bernardazzi (1773–1837). After completing his studies in Milan, and receiving his diploma in architecture (1834), he went to Saint Petersburg, where he had received commissions for work on the Winter Palace. He also worked in Kronstadt and Moscow.

In 1851, he decorated the bell tower at Saints Peter and Paul Cathedral in Saint Petersburg. In 1855, he was in Sebastopol, planning and building fortifications for the Crimean War.

He returned to Switzerland in 1859 where, in addition to painting and architectural work, he served as a teacher. His paintings include vedute of Lugano; dedicated to the writer, Dora d'Istria and the politician, Carlo Battaglini.

His personal papers, plans, and a portrait have been preserved in the Bernardazzi family archives.

== Sources ==
- "Giuseppe Bernardazzi" in German, French and Italian in the online Historical Dictionary of Switzerland.
- "Bernardazzi, Giuseppe (junior)". SIKART Lexicon on art in Switzerland.
