= Anne Torcapel =

Swiss architect

- Born: 25 November 1916; Les Eaux-Vives, Switzerland
- Died: 29 January 1988 (aged 71); Geneva, Switzerland
- Occupation: Architect

Anne Torcapel (25 November 1916 – 29 January 1988) was a Swiss architect. She undertook many projects in and around her native city of Geneva, including villas, apartment buildings, other structures and enlargements and conversions.

== Family ==
Anne Torcapel was born on 25 November 1916 in Les Eaux-Vives, now part of Geneva. She was the daughter of John Torcapel (1881–1965) and of Marthe Berthoud (1887–1964). Her mother was very cultivated, a musician and writer, although her writings have not survived. John Torcapel was the son of a watchmaker. He studied at the Ecole des Beaux-Arts of Geneva. He opened an office as an architect in 1924, and was mainly concerned with new housing in the canton of Geneva. He also undertook many enlargements and conversions of existing buildings. He became chairman of the Federation of Swiss architects. He was a professor at the Ecole des Beaux-Arts of Geneva from 1930 to 1942 and professor at the School of Architecture of the University of Geneva from 1942 to 1953. He died on 21 July 1965, soon after his wife.

== Career ==
From an early age Anne Torcapel frequented building sites. She never married. She began studies as a designer at the Geneva Engineering School in 1933, while also working in the engineer Dentan's office. In 1934 she moved to the Ecole des Beaux-Arts in Geneva to study architecture. Her teachers included Arnold Hoechel, Louis Vincent and her father. In 1937 she obtained a certificate of capacity, with honours. In 1938 she obtained a diploma as architectural designer. As late as 1943 she took industrial courses in the evening and obtained qualifications in building and wood.

Anne Torcapel began working in her father's office in the 1940s, and also collaborated with Marie-Louise Leclerc (1911–2001), daughter of the architect Antoine Leclerc. By 1953 she had 15 years of professional experience. That year she became her father's partner, and was inscribed in the Swiss Register of engineers, architects and technicians. In 1956, she created the gynecology polyclinic and the operating theater of the Geneva maternity ward in collaboration with Marie-Louise Leclerc. She participated in the 1958 SAFFA (Geneva Pavilion). John Torcapel steadily reduced his activity and retired around 1960. Their only known joint work is the Temple of Onex, designed in the late 1950s.

Anne Torcapel was involved with the Soroptimists, a system of local clubs and larger unions in which women from different professions engage in projects for women. The organization is philanthropic rather than militant. She represented architects in the Geneva club for several decades, and was long-term president of this club. She represented the Soroptimists in the Centre de liaison des associations féminines genevoises (CLAFG), and was Governor of the Swiss Soroptimists Union in 1952–53. Anne Torcapel took over her father's office around 1960. She experienced an episode of diabetic coma in 1986 which prevented her from completing two houses she was working on and severely affected her health. Two long-time associates, Pierre Gebel and Yves Rochat, took over the office. Anne Torcapel died on 29 January 1988 in Geneva. She was buried in Thônex cemetery beside her parents.

== Principal works ==
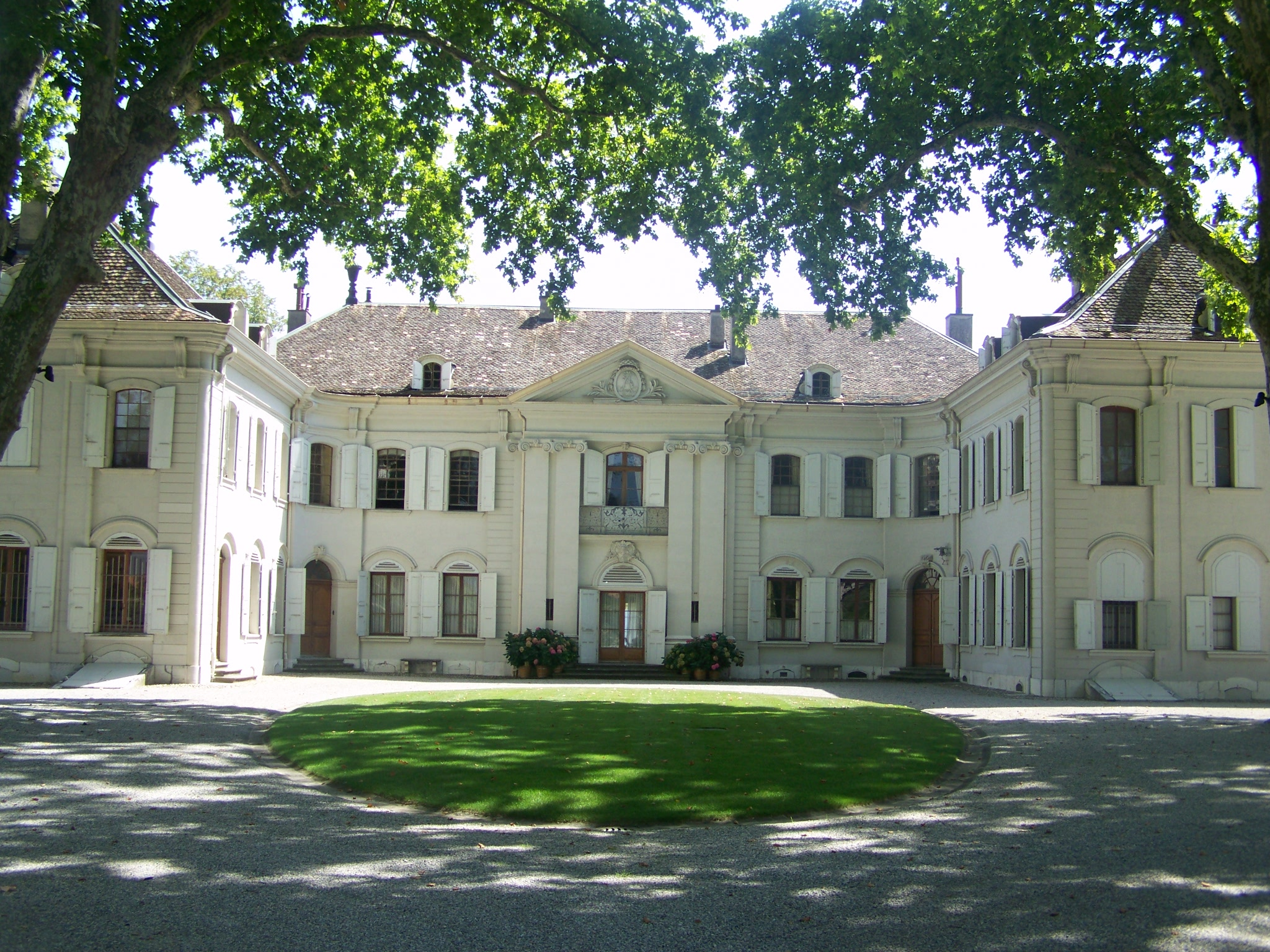
Château de Crans - Anne Torcapel undertook the conversion

Anne Torcapel's work included at least 47 villas, 16 buildings, 10 other works and 30 transformations of existing buildings. She built for the elite families of Geneva and for the poorest, always with high quality. Evelyne Lang has proposed that Anne Torcapel's work exemplified a unique women's architectural design.

- 1945-1948: renovations and transformations at the Taverne de la Madeleine (Geneva) - with Marie-Louise Leclerc
- 1950-1956: enlargement of the Geneva maternity ward (west wing and polyclinic, making possible the presence of fathers during childbirth, destroyed in 2013) - with Marie-Louise Leclerc
- 1951: annex and transformation to the La Rochette preventorium (Longirod) (converted building)
- 1953: transformation of the nursery school Le Bon Secours (Geneva)
- 1954: series of single-story villas with the engineer Lucien Duflon
- 1955-1957: first villa of the writer Alix de Watteville (Cologny)
- 1958: interior design of the Geneva Boutique of SAFFA 58 (Zurich)
- 1959: second villa of the writer Alix de Watteville (Chêne-Bougeries)
- 1959: wings, outbuilding, swimming pool and garden pavilion at Château de Chignan (Vernier)
- 1960-1968: real estate complex on Krieg avenue and rue Pédro-Meylan (Geneva) - with Alfred Damay
- 1961-1962: third villa of the writer Alix de Watteville (Cologny)
- 1961-1962: social housing building for single women (quai des Vernets 5–7, Geneva)
- 1962: "Le Clos des Sapins" holiday camp (Saint-Cergue)
- 1962-1963: silo of Le Pallanterie and enlargement of the mills (Vésenaz)
- 1962-1963: HLM buildings for the Protestant Parish (chemin François-Chavaz 3–5, Onex)
- 1963-1964: Villa Bodmer
- 1964: Villa Dottrens
- 1964: Temple of Onex - with John Torcapel. Protestant church (Onex)
- 1966: Villa Odier
- 1968: residential building (rue Pédro-Meylan 2, Geneva)
- 1970: underground gallery of the Martin Bodmer Foundation (Cologny, almost completely destroyed)
- 1970-1972: Villa de Marignac
- 1972-1974: HLM buildings for the Protestant Parish (Chancy Road 126–128, Onex)
- 1978: transformation of the Château de Crans (Crans-près-Céligny)
- 1978-1979: residential building (rue Pédro-Meylan 4, Geneva)
- 1979-1980: Villa Schluep
- 1979-1980: transformations at the Château Le Fief (Chéserex)
- 1981-1982: social housing building for single women (avenue de Chamonix 5–7, Geneva)
- 1986: Villa Aeschimann

== Sources ==
- Chevally, Guy (2012), La carrière de l’architecte genevoise Anne Torcapel (1916-1988). Tentative d'inventaire (Master's thesis) (in French), Univ. Genève
- Lang, Evelyne (1992), Les Premieres Femmes Architectes De Suisse (PDF) (in French), Ecole Polytechnique Federale De Lausanne
- Lang Jakob, Evelyne (15 September 2011), "Torcapel, Anne", Dictionnaire historique de la Suisse (in French)
- Ziegler, Erica Deuber; Tikhonov, Natalia (2005), "Anne Torcapel", Les femmes dans la mémoire de Genève: du XVe au XXe siècle (in French), Éditions Suzanne Hurter
