= Marie Ferrier-Perregaux =

Swiss artist (1777–1838)

Jeanne-Marie-Françoise Perregaux, later Ferrier-Perregaux (1777–1838) was a Swiss painter.

Ferrier-Perregaux was born in Lausanne, the daughter of architect and ivory carver Alexandre Perregaux. She was known for her portrait miniatures, and according to the letters of Sophie von La Roche also produced pastels.
