= Alexandre Perregaux =

Swiss architect (1749–1808)

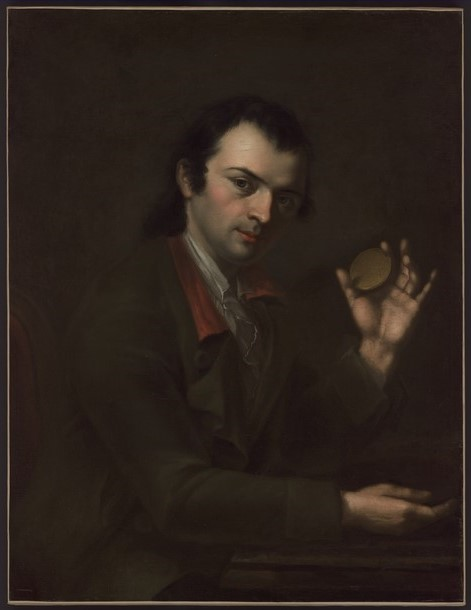
- Anonymous portrait of Perregaux (between 1774-1789)
- Born: 1 April 1749; Lausanne, Swiss Confederacy
- Died: 21 May 1808 (aged 59); Lausanne, Switzerland
- Occupation: Architect
- Children: Marie Perregaux
- Buildings: Grand Council of Vaud

Alexandre Perregaux (1 April 1749 – 21 May 1808) was a Swiss architect, goldsmith, and ivory carver. He is best known for his design of government buildings for the canton of Vaud, in Switzerland.

== Biography ==
Perregaux was born in Lausanne on April 1, 1749, to Jonas Perregaux, a carpenter from Geneveys-sur-Coffrane, and Marie-Françoise Bergier. After an apprenticeship as a goldsmith from 1761 to 1765, he completed his formation in Rome. He then returned to Lausanne, where he was active as an ivory carver in miniatures and medallions. Many of these ivory reliefs were then painted by Perregaux's daughter, Marie Ferrier-Perregaux.

He began his career as an architect in 1789, his first work being the Maison de Villamont, in Lausanne, a house built for himself between 1791 and 1793. In 1798, with the ascension of the Helvetic Republic, he was employed by the new government and entrusted with the maintenance of public buildings. After the Act of Mediation and the collapse of the republic in 1803, the Swiss Confederacy was restored but with new sovereign cantons, among them Vaud, formerly ruled as subject lands before the French invasion.

Perregaux was quickly commissioned by the new cantonal administration with the design of buildings that were to be used by the Vaudois government in Lausanne, among them the central Post Office, built between 1805 and 1807, and the building of the Grand Council of Vaud, built between 1803 and 1806. The latter housed the Grand Council since its inauguration until it was severely damaged by a fire in 2002. He also designed the first theatre of Lausanne, the Marterey, inaugurated in 1805 and later replaced in 1871.

== Gallery ==
=== Works ===
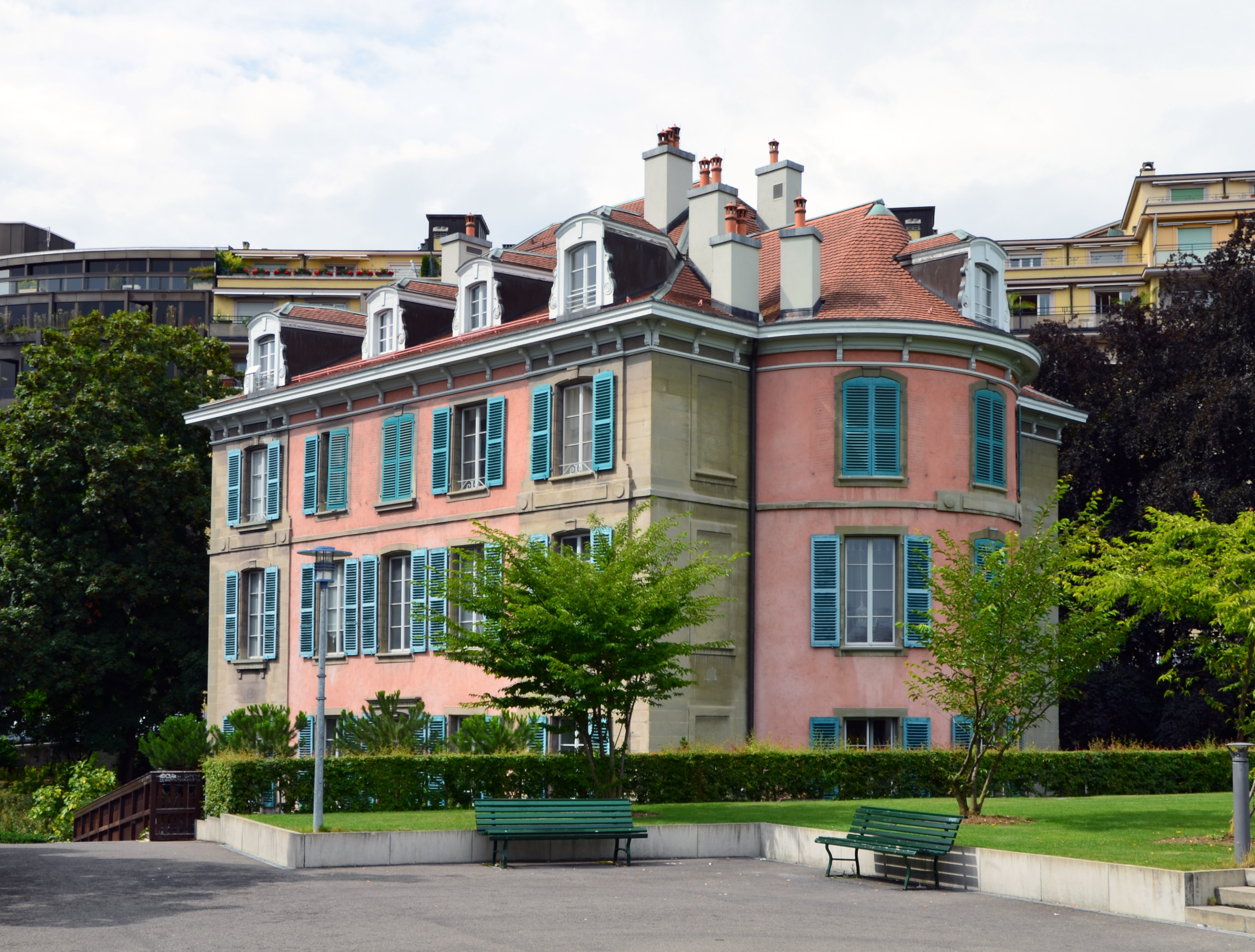
Maison de Villamont, Perregaux's house in Lausanne (completed in 1793)

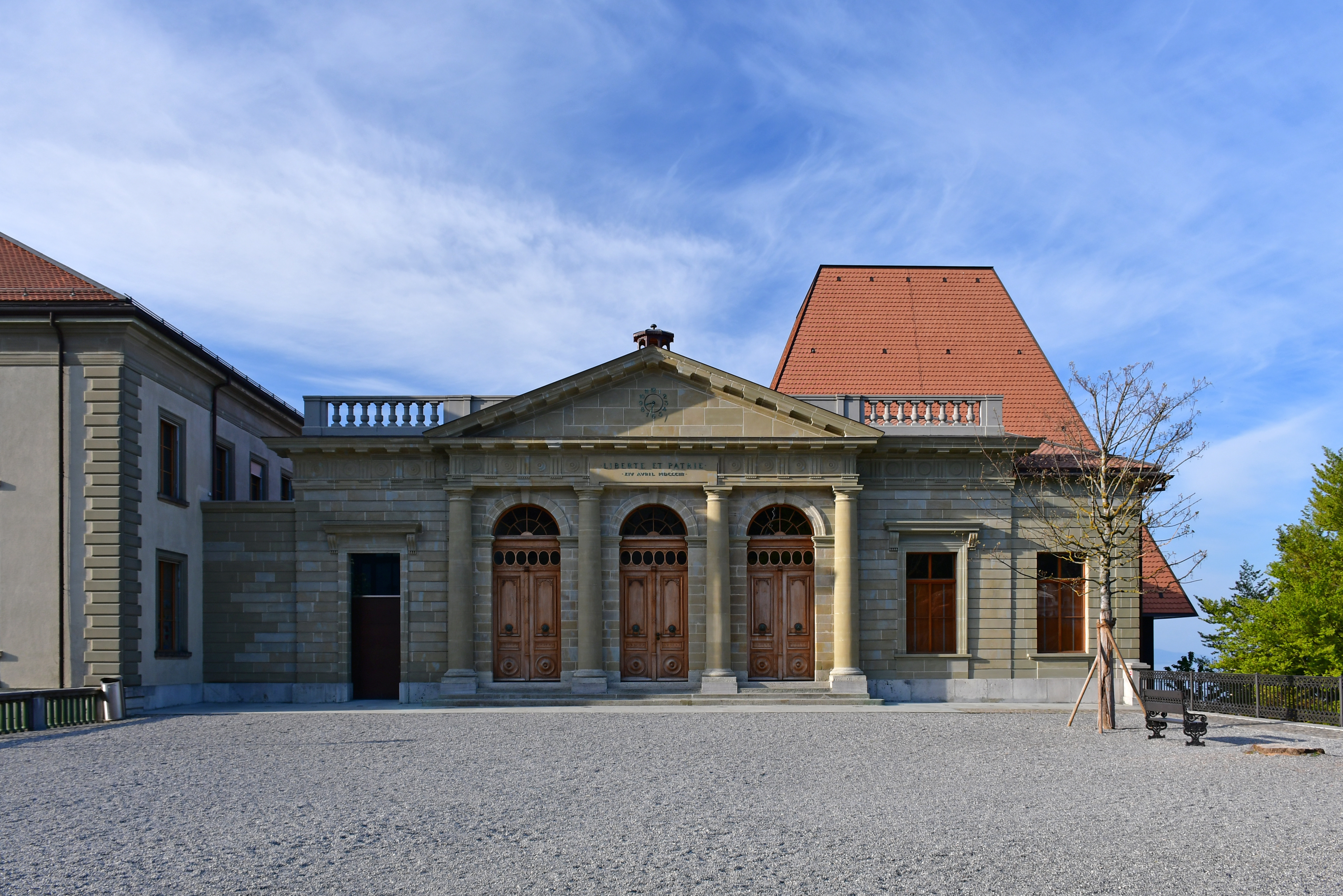
The facade of the Grand Council building, which survived the 2002 fire that damaged most of the structure (completed in 1806)

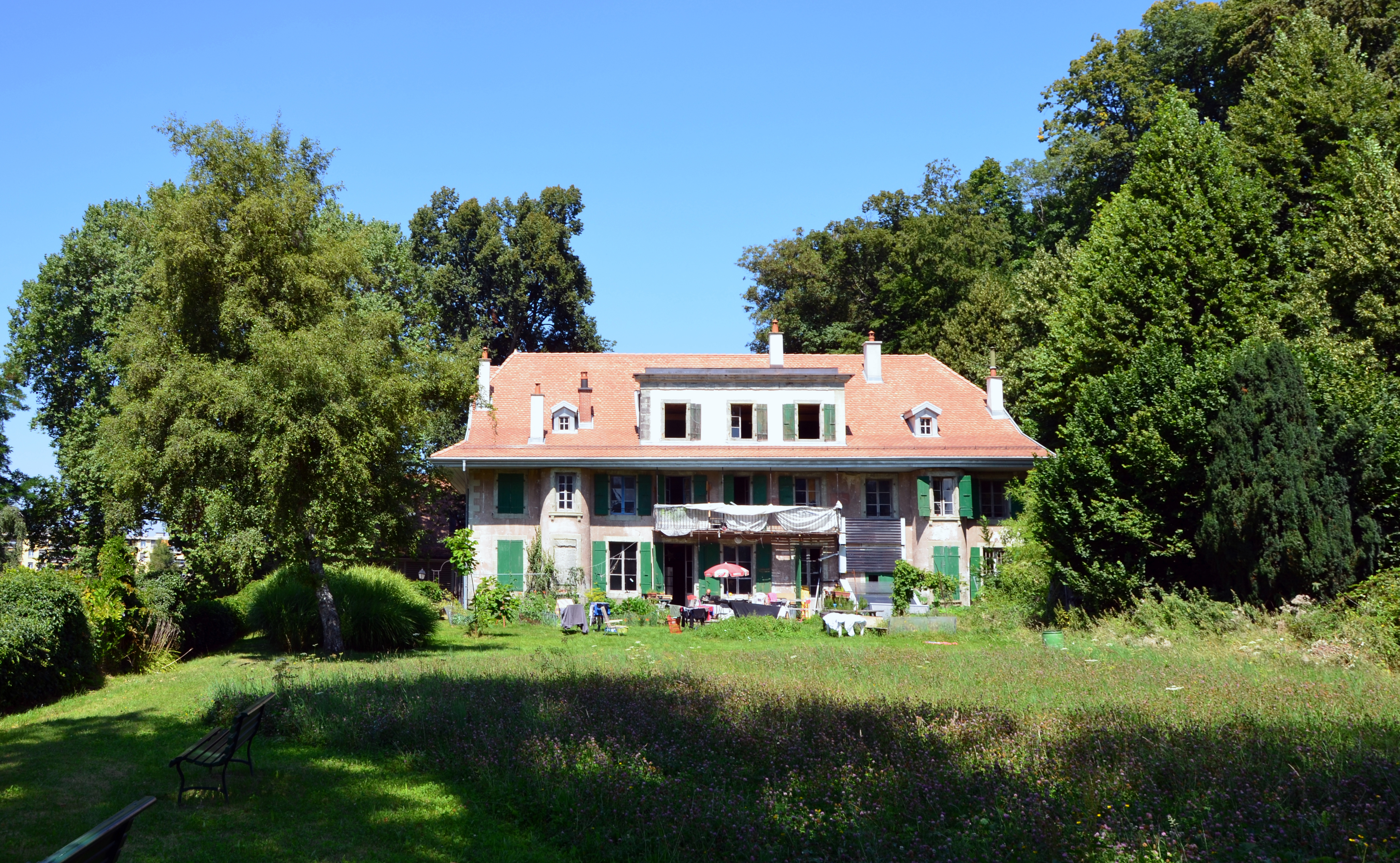
Campagne du Désert, a Cultural Property of Regional Significance, in Lausanne
