= Predigerkirche =

Predigerkirche (German for "Preacher's Church", after the Dominican Order which was also known as The Order of Preachers) may refer to the following churches:

- Predigerkirche (Erfurt) in Erfurt
- Predigerkirche (Zürich) in Zürich
- Predigerkloster in Zürich
