= Weesen Abbey =

Monastery in Weesen, Switzerland

Dominikanerinnenkloster Maria Zuflucht
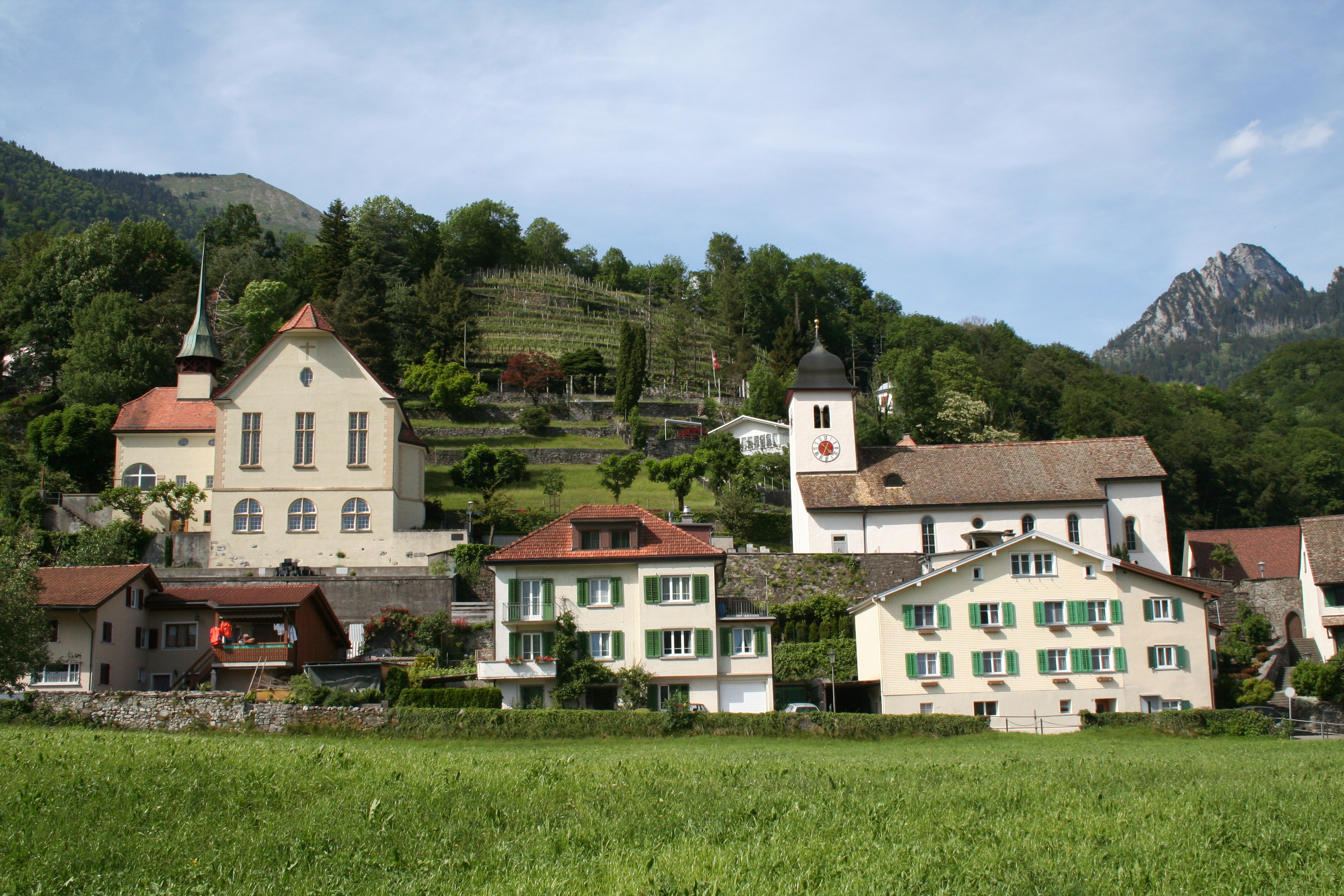

- Location within Canton of St. Gallen Location within Switzerland

Monastery information
- Other names: Maria Zuflucht Abbey; Weesen Nunnery
- Order: Dominican Order
- Established: 7 October 1256
- Diocese: Roman Catholic Diocese of Chur
- Controlled churches: 1

People
- Founder: Rudolf IV von Rapperswil
- Prior: Sister Magdalena (ODSHLT)
- Important associated figures: convent consists of 9 nuns and one lay women (as of 2015)

Site
- Location: Weesen, Canton of St. Gallen, Switzerland
- Coordinates: 47°08′07″N 9°05′47″E
- Visible remains: monastery complex of 1688/90
- Public access: church and guest house open to the public, private area and library/archives restricted
- Other information: guest house, and offers temporary stays (Kloster auf Zeit) for women between 18 and 40 years. In addition, the nuns provide pastoral care, run a cloister shop and a bakery that bakes eucharistic breads, as well as an atelier that produces candles and icons. The nunnery also houses a well known collection of theological literature that includes about 8,400 works.

Weesen Abbey (German: Dominikanerinnenkloster Maria Zuflucht, ODSHLT) is a monastery of Dominican nuns located in Weesen in the Canton of St. Gallen, Switzerland. The Dominican convent is located at the foot of a terraced hillside in the middle of the town of Weesen on the effluence of the Maag respectively Linth from Walensee. Established in 1256, Weesen is the oldest Dominican friary of nuns in Switzerland. The buildings and the library (about 8,400 works) respectively archives are listed in the Swiss inventory of cultural property of national and regional significance.

== History ==
The name Weesen was first mentioned on 28 August 1232, in a document that confirms an exchange of goods between members of the noble families of Kyburg and Rapperswil in the villages of Oberwesin and Niderwesin that were in the possession of Kyburg to 1264 respectively of Rapperwil to 1283, when Rudolf V, the underaged brother of Elisabeth von Rapperswil died, and the fiefs were acquired by Rudolf von Habsburg.

But the nucleus of the monastic community "in den Wyden" was a so-called Clos, a community of lay women or Beguines who lived in these woods (German: Wyden) before the monastery was established. With the rapid spread of the Dominican order, brother convents emerged in Zürich and Chur. Weesen was in the middle of the road of the two brother convents, and the brothers in their migrations came in contact with the modest community of beguines. As the oldest document of the monastery testifies, the women in Weesen joined the Dominican Order on 7 October 1256, and Maria Zuflucht is the oldest monastery of its kind in Switzerland.

The sisterhood in Weesen was mentioned as "Sorores de congregacione in Wesen" in 1256 for the first time. From the Bishop of Chur, the community was given the right to free reception of novices, and even the authority to grant their benefactors an indulgence. Situated between the former villages of Oberwesin and Niderwesin, in 1259 Count Rudolf IV von Rapperswil, Countess Elisabeth's father, donated certain duties and lands "in den Widen" for the construction of their monastery. Initially, the community was supported by Predigerkloster Zürich, because its close relationship to the House of Rapperswil. After the founding of the monastery, the Dominican friars in Chur took over the pastoral assistance in Weesen. Heinrich III, Bishop of Konstanz, in 1272 issued the authorization to build a chapel, and called a Dominican priest for the fair, the sacraments and the pastoral care of the nunnery. With episcopal permission, the convention was allowed to bury its deceased members in the monastic church. At Christmas, Easter and Pentecost, the nuns had to go to parish church of Weesen. In 1288 the Bishop granted an indulgence and consecrated the chapel. In the same year Weesen was mentioned as a walled city outside the convent in Widen. Among other donations, the nunnery was given land in the Durnachtal valley, sealed on 17 June 1353 in Glarus, when Judenta Wäzzi was mentioned as a nun in Weesen. Prior to 1319, the nuns were forced, apparently by the local priest, to comply with the Augustinian rule; the circumstances are unknown, but the congregation seems soon to be returned to the Dominican rule, as specifically mentioned in a document dated 13 March 1354: "Die gaistlich frouwe, die priorin der samenunge zu Wide bi Wesenne gelegen...gemeinlich prediger orden"; Prediger is the commonly used German name for the Dominican order.

After the defeat of the House of Habsburg at Näfels on 9 April 1388, the city of Weesen was burned down. At the beginning of the 15th century, the town was rebuilt, again as a confederate of the Habsburg family, being then an open settlement at its present location at the Dominican convent which was called in the 15th century "St. Verena", and "Maria Zuflucht" (literally Mary refuge) from 1699. As one of the few monasteries in Switzerland, Weesen widely was spared from the repercussions of the 1520s Swiss Reformation, probably not least because the monastery still eked out a poor existence, so there was no reason for looting. Nevertheless, the iconoclasm lay lamed the monastic life briefly, and the sisters fled to a two-year exile. On their return, the nuns found their monastery desecrated and devastated. Only in the second half of the 17th century, the convent completely recovered. But also some pastors of the town of Weesen repeatedly tried to undermine the preferential rights of the monastery. Thanks to the episcopal safeguards, the monastic life, however, remained untouched. The life of the monastic community ever has been ruled by simplicity and poverty, and its history is closely connected to the small town of Weesen. To date there is a good relationship between the people of Weesen and the nunnery.

== Buildings ==
The monastery was originally situated extra muros civitatis, meaning outside of the town walls of Weesen. But in contrast to the Latin term, the town was built around the monastery after Weesen burned down in 1388. Probably the original monastery church was built in the area of the present guest house in the southernly wing of the present building complex. Between 1688 and 1690 the nunnery was rebuilt and its church was richly decorated. The basic shape of the church was also given to the monastery as it exists today. There were also plans to rebuild the monastery on the upper hill named Gmähl, caused to the recurring floods, but a new construction became obsolete when the Linth canal was built in the 19th century. However, the monastery was renamed at the same time, which provides refuge for the dedication of Mary (Maria Zuflucht). The first flood of 1350 was not the last. Until recently, the community severed repeatedly, in particular, in the 18th century the monastery was three times heavily affected by the river's water, and the foundations even partially washed-away. Not before the correction of the Linth/Maag river-system was carried out in the early 19th century, it was repeatedly rebuilt and renewed. The monastery indeed is built halfway on a rocky ground, but the foundations show a visible crack through the nearly entire building complex.

The church and monastery guest house are open to the public, but the other sections of the nunnery are part of the private area (Klausur) of the monastic community. The buildings of the monastery were renewed in 2005, and there were plans to redesign its gardens.

=== Church ===
In the so-called Rätischer Reichsurbar of 842/43 AD, a basilica in Widen, tributary to the Pfäfers Abbey, is mentioned which was located at the outflow of the Lauibach stream. Although this church was abandoned, there a sisterhood was established. The monastic church was completed in 1278. But in 1350 the monastery complex and the church were severely damaged by a devastating flood of the Lauibach stream. A year later, a new church was consecrated in honor of the Holy Trinity. From 1688 to 1690 a new building was erected, which was no longer open, but designed as a closed, compact square, in contrast to the previous three-winged church. In the baroque new building some components of the original construction phase were integrated, as well as the church interior. With its onion dome, the church forms the west wing of the square-shaped building complex. In 1822 the new organ in the choir of the monastery church was completed for the amount of 323 Gulden. The organ was moved to the gallery in 1884, and in 1958 replaced by a new instrument. The oldest still visible components are the 200-year-old ceiling beams.

== Monastic library ==
The library includes works of asceticism, mysticism and liturgy. The reference library is located in the enclosure area, and is therefore usually not open to the public, but intake by agreement with the librarian. The library occupies two rooms in the northeastern part of the monastery.

=== Origin ===
In the second half of the 17th century, a small library stock was established, comprising mainly literature on asceticism. Continued in the 18th century, the purchase of books occurred within narrow limits. During the Helvetic Republic and shortly thereafter, because of the French and Austrian troops billeted, among others book losses occurred. When in 1906 the last two nuns of the Dominican convent St. Katharinental (dissolved in 1869) moved to Weesen, they also contributed approximately 440 volumes of German ascetic literature. This forms the core of the still preserved early modern portfolio, which was developed for the most part in the 20th century, along with recent literature, in list files referred to authors and subjects. In 1973 there were taken over about 1,000 volumes of the library of the auxiliary priest home of Redemptorists (German: Hilfspriesterheim der Redemptoristen), including 25 works published before 1900. Since the mid-20th century, fictional literature was increasingly purchased.

=== Library collection ===
The collection includes around 8,400 works, of which 1,466 (17.5%) belong to the old stock. 6 prints appeared in the 16th century, 61 in the 17th century, 350 in the 18th century, and 1049 in the 19th century. 1,172 works are in German, 235 in Latin, 47 in French, 6 in Italian, 4 in English, and 1 is written in Hebrew as well as one in Danish. 93.6% (1,358 titles) belong to the theological sciences and only 6.4% (108 works) to the other sciences.

Just over half of the theological literature (715 works or 53%) are topics related to asceticism: 237 (17.3%) liturgy, predominantly breviaries, 152 (11.2%) hagiography, 72 (5.3%) music and song books, 53 (3.9%) religious rules and rule explanations, 38 (2.8%) church history and each 23 (1.7%) bible literature and patristic. Works on the topics of catechesis (16 units) and homiletics (11 units) are represented in small numbers, mainly because of the ecclesial status of the nuns, and probably also because of the small number of male spiritual donors. The same applies to the theoretical disciplines of theology as the exegetics and dogmatic theology (each with 8 works) and moral theology (2 works). Of the Latin writings, account 233 to theological topics, which include 211 (90.5%) of the liturgic works.

The asceticism segment (715 units) comprises 701 German and 12 French work, each one ccripture is written in Latin and in Italian. Two prints date back to the 16th century (including Adam Walassar's "Von der Gemahelschafft des Himlischen Künigs", Dillingen 1572), 35 from the 17th century, 160 from the 18th century and 518 from the 19th century. The majority of early modern prints was part of the library of the St. Katharina's convent, a small number from other monasteries, for example, "Abraham a Sancta Clara, Beschreibung der berühmbten Wallfahrt Maria Stern", Baden 1688, from the Rheinau Abbey. Franz von Sales wrote 17 titles. The writings of Teresa von Avila (two parts in one volume, Würzburg 1649) were donated by Freiherr Franz von Entzenberg, canon in Brixen, to the Weesen nun Maria Theresia Barell. Popular authors are Michael Lintzel (14 works), Anna Katharina Emmerich (13), Alban Stolz (12), Martin von Cochem (11), Alphons Maria Liguori (10) and Ludwig de Ponte (9). Liturgy comprises the regulations and the hagiographic literature of almost exclusively of religious literature related to Christian orders, for example Regul deß Heiligen Vatters Augustini" (Konstanz 1722) edited by from Johann Stirm, "Regel und Satzungen der Schwestern Prediger=Ordens" (Augsburg 1735), or "Idea sanctitatis. Beschreibung deß Lebens Dominici" (Augsburg 1697) from the Dominican Abbey in Konstanz.

Medicine and herbalism (16 works) are represented by Lorenz Fries' "Spiegel der artzney" (Strassburg 1532), "Das krëuterbuch Oder Herbarius" (Augsburg 1534), "Die Neue Apothecker/Jar=Ordnung" (Wien 1744), and "Volksaufklärerische Anleitung für das Landvolk in Absicht auf seine Gesundheit" (Augsburg 1787) by Auguste Tissot and translated into German by Hans Kaspar Hirzel. Among the subjects of profane literature are mainly works of fiction and aesthetics (25), for example Karl Philipp Moritz' (editor) "Denkwürdigkeiten, aufgezeichnet zur Beförderung des Edlen und Schönen" (Berlin 1786), and "Lafontaine’s Fabeln, französisch und deutsch" (Berlin 1795) published by Samuel Heinrich Catel. Worth mentioning are further grammars and dictionaries (14), literature on the history (13) and cook and maid books (17), e.g. "Luzernerisches Koch=Buch" (Luzern 1809), "Constanzer Kochbuch" (Konstanz 1827 and 1835).

=== Cataloging ===
Available are modern general catalogs, card catalogs (for old stock), alphabetical author catalog, biogeochemical catalog within the material then alphabetically by title, an alphabetically persons subject catalog to the fields "biography" and "hagiography" by the people-keywords, location catalog, and a volume catalog that partly deviates from the biogeochemical catalog. The store catalog comprises also statistics from November 1949 (1,630 volumes) and as per 8 February 1979 (4,177 volumes), and there are various other categorizing ysystems, including catalogs of stocks from the years 1900, 1907, 1916, 1930/31, 1950, 1960 and 1973.

== Activities ==
As of 2015, nine Dominican nuns and a lay woman, aged between 44 and 76, live in the Weesen nunnery. As of 2003, the community was (average age of 59 years) a relatively low-aged monastery; the youngest nun was 36 years old, the oldest one 83. Like many other monasteries, there were for decades no new novices, but from 1983 to 2003 six women joined the monastic community, and three of them became nuns of the Weesen nunnery. 16 to 18 nuns would be ideal for the monastic life in Weesen, but to go active on a quest to attract new novices for the monastery, contradicts the community's attitude.

The monastic community provides a guest house, and offers temporary stays in the community, the so-called "temporary monastery" (German: Kloster auf Zeit) for women between 18 and 40 years. In addition, the nuns provide pastoral care, run a cloister shop and a bakery that bakes eucharistic breads, as well as an atelier that produces candles and icons.

The Weesen Abbey provides one of the most modern wafer bakery in Switzerland and was installed in 2002, amounting to costs of CHF 200,000. Full-automatically the thin liquid batter is poured onto the hot plates and baked in a passage within two minutes. Before Christmas and Easter we are experiencing the greatest demand, because of high religious holidays more people attend services, the demand for wafers is correspondingly greater. Every week about 30,000 brown and white 3,000 wafers are baked in Weesen. These are exclusively made of flour and water, without leavening agent such as yeast or baking powder. The Eucharist wafers must be baked, according to the canon law, of pure wheat flour. When the fully baked bread plates have been stored for a few hours in a room with high humidity, the small round wafers are subsequently cut. About two million of these little biscuits are produced each year alone in the monastery of Weesen. The wafer baking is almost exclusively the domain of a few convents in Switzerland.

== Cultural heritage ==
The building complex and the monastic archives/library are listed in the Swiss inventory of cultural property of national and regional significance as a Class B object of regional importance.

== Literature ==
- Roger Sablonier: Gründungszeit ohne Eidgenossen: Politik und Gesellschaft in der Innerschweiz um 1300. hier + jetzt, Baden 2008, ISBN 978-3-03919-085-0.
- Bernhard Anderes: Schweizerische Kunstführer GSK, Volume 535/536: Weesen – Dominikanerinnenkloster und Bühlkirche. Bern 1993, ISBN 3-85782-535-9.
- Erwin Eugster: Adlige Territorialpolitik in der Ostschweiz. Kirchliche Stiftungen im Spannungsfeld früher landesherrlicher Verdrängungspolitik. Zürich 1991, ISBN 3-90527-868-5.
