= Predigerkirche Zurich =

Church in Zurich, Switzerland

Predigerkirche
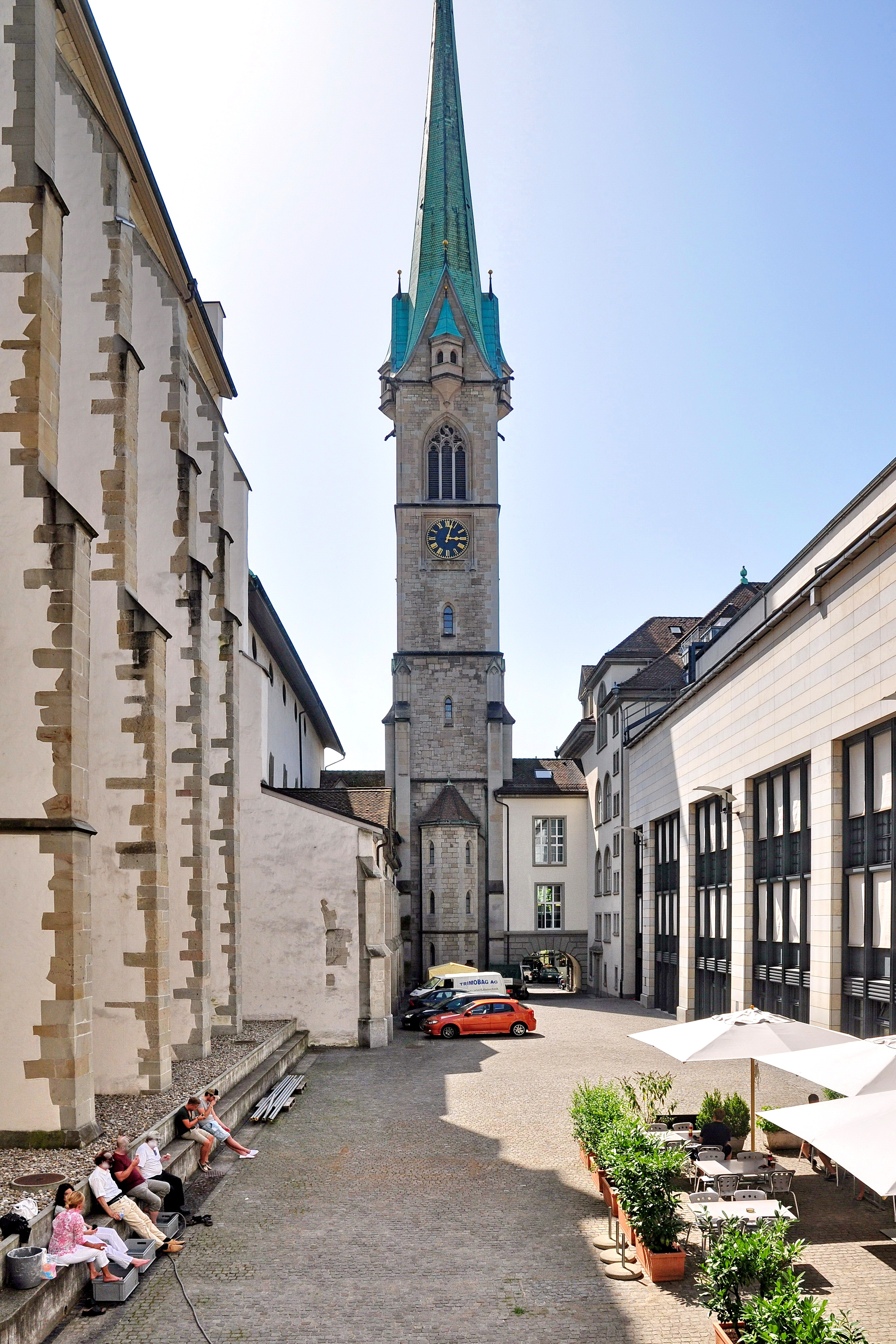
- Predigerkirche to the left, the adjoint Zentralbibliothek to the right, the 96 metres (315 ft) high church tower in the middle
- Predigerkirche
- 47°22′25.72″N 8°32′43.09″E
- Location: Niederdorf district, Zürich; Switzerland
- Denomination: Reformed
- Previous denomination: Roman Catholic
- Website: Official website (in German)

Architecture
- Architect: Friedrich Wehrli (church tower of 1900)
- Architectural type: Church
- Style: Romanesque, Gothic, Gothic Revival
- Completed: circa 1231 (Romanesque church); circa 1350 (Gothic church); 1900 (Gothic Revival church tower)

Administration
- District: Evangelical Reformed Church of the Canton of Zürich

The Predigerkirche is one of the four main churches of the old town of Zürich, Switzerland, besides Fraumünster, Grossmünster and St. Peter. First built in 1231 AD as a Romanesque church of the then Dominican Predigerkloster, the Basilica was converted in the first half of the 14th century, the choir between 1308 and 1350 rebuilt, and a for that time unusual high bell tower was built, regarded as the highest Gothic edifice in Zürich.

== History ==
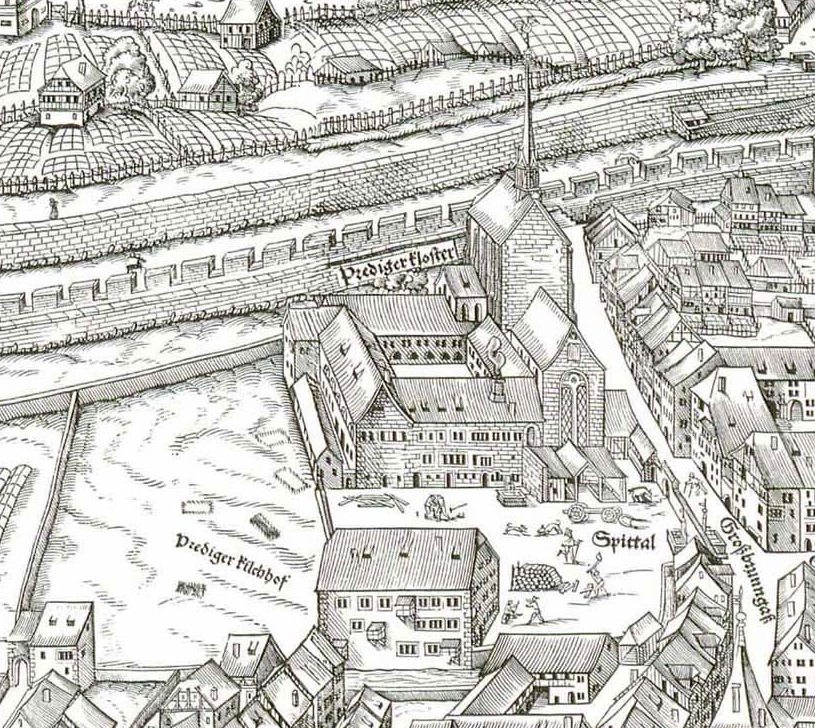
Predigerkloster on the so-called Murerplan of 1576

Located nearby the medieval Neumarkt quarter, the church that commonly is named Predigerkirche was mentioned for the first time in 1234 AD as the Predigerkloster monastery of the Dominican Order. The first Dominican friars settled, according to the chronicler Heinrich Brennwald, outside of the city walls of medieval Zürich at Stadelhofen in 1230, and the construction of a new convent in Zürich was first mentioned in 1231. Initially, against the resistance of the Grossmünster canons, the Dominican's inclusion in Zürich was granted in 1233/1235, because they tirelessly drove the little foxes in the vineyard of the Lord. The monastery consisted of a Romanesque church at the same place as today, and the monastic buildings built around the adjointed cloister to its west. In 1254 the establishment of a cemetery at Zähringerstrasse was allowed to the so-called "prayer" (used for Dominican friars, the 'blackfriars') abbey, and repealed in 1843. The order purchased 28 houses in the 13th and early 14th century. The convent was in close connection to the city nobility and landed gentry in Zürich and the surrounding area, among them the Bilgeri family (Grimmenturm) and the House of Rapperswil, where they received asylum in Rapperswil after their expulsion by 1348. Memorial measurements had to be held at Grossmünster until the 14th century, because thus the most income was achieved. Until the Reformation in Zürich all income obtained with the funerals had also to be delivered to the Grossmünster abbey. Within the late medieval city, as the other "mendicant" orders, the Dominicans have been reduced to the function of area pastors.

The convent was abolished on 3 December 1524, the worship in the church was discontinued, and the buildings and income of the monastery were assigned to the Heilig-Geist-Spital, then an hospital of the city of Zürich. The pastor of the "preachers" was initially subordinated to the parish of the Grossmünster, in 1571 raised to the rank of a Grossmünster Canon Regular, and in 1575 he was allowed to share the Lord's Supper according to the Reformed liturgy, the so-called Abendmahlsgottesdienst. In 1614 the church was raised to a separate parish for the Neumarkt and Niederdorf districts within the city, as well as the then independent municipalities of Oberstrass and Unterstrass–Fluntern were assigned to the parish. The French revolutionary troops allowed again the Catholic worship, but after only two years, the parish was reverted into a Reformed church on 17 October 1801. The church is since 1897 property of the Kirchgemeinde Predigern parish. In the 1960s it has been renovated, and re-opened in 1967. As of today Predigern is used as the "open town church with Ecumenical profile", in fact built as a parish church, but as a place of encounter and of the church community from the inner city, as well as of the suburban region.

== Architecture ==
=== The first Romanesque church ===
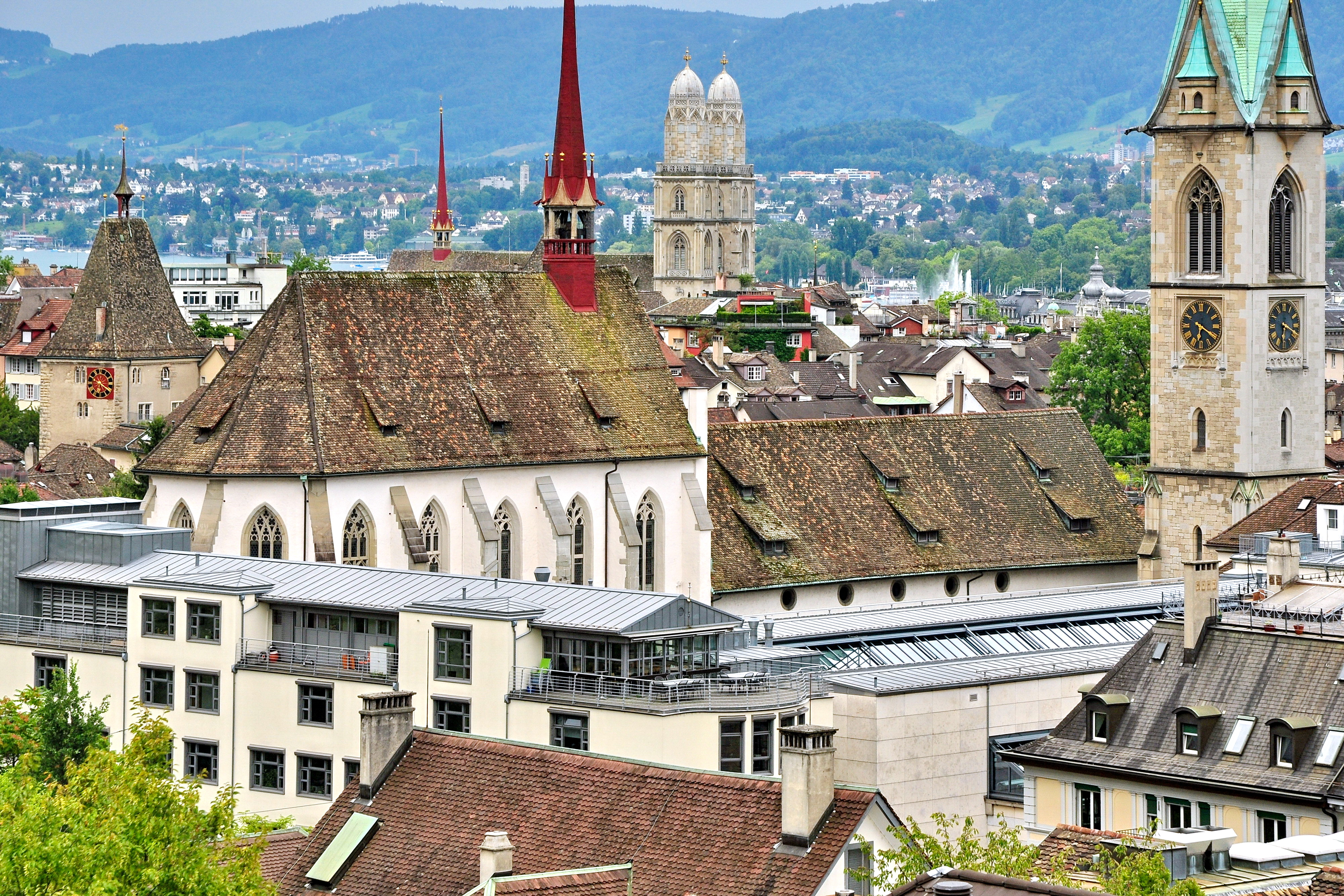
Predigerkirche as seen from ETH Zurich, the Zentralbibliothek building in the foreground

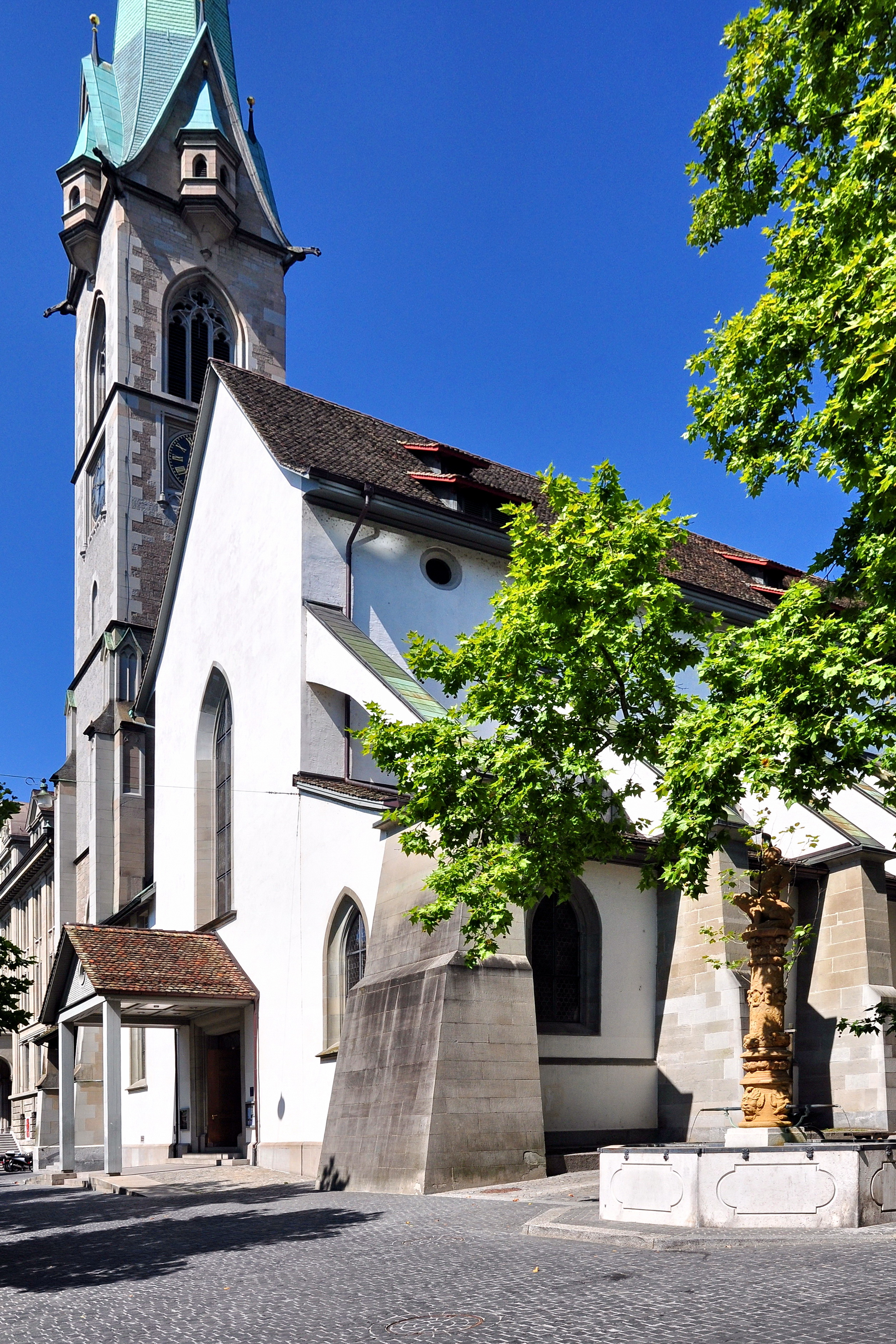
as seen from Zähringerplatz

According to the building-historical research of the years 1990/96, the first church of the Dominicans was built in 1231 as a distinct Romanesque Basilica including a transept and two small apses in the spiral arms of the transept. The closed choir was fairly spacious, with an area of 10 x 10 metres (33 ft), being a reminiscent of the still existing choir of the former Fraumünster basilica, that only a few years before was built. Archaeological finds show that the church had been planned to be originally shorter in the length than it is today. During the construction period, the building was extended on the today's west facade. The first church was very long, measuring 61 metres (200 ft) in the interior of the central nave, but its height of around 12 metres (39 ft) and width of 10 metres (33 ft) rather low. The Romanesque church seems to have caught fire, possibly several times. The fire in the Romanesque choir was arguably even occasion for its new building, as the wall in the western facade had several traces of fire. Probably the original Romanesque western facade had smaller windows then shown in the Murerplan, three narrow, high arched windows, similar to the still extant windows in the choir of the Fraumünster church. The entire church had a flat wooden ceiling.

The low height and stressed simplicity of the architectural details were according to the restrictive rules in the early days of the Dominicans. This first church building belongs to the few ones that are known from the early days of the order at all, what also explains the unusual transept. Different than from those in the south of the Alps, where transepts in the churches of the mendicant orders were common, in the north that kind of architecture was largely not used after 1250. The model for the shape of the Zürich church might be the Basilica of San Domenico in Bologna; it is slightly older, and was at that time probably the most important church of the Dominicans, where their founder Saint Dominic was buried in 1221. Both, the Zürich and Bolognese churches, show that the early Dominicans were still strongly influenced by older orders like the Cistercians. The first Predigerkirche in Zürich also shows that the "Preachers" in this early period were no more a poor itinerant order, which had built small churches for their own needs, the needs of just monks. At the time the Zürich church was built, it was the largest church in the city.

=== The Gothic choir ===
Probably after a fire, the Romanesque choir was replaced in the first half of the 14th century by a Gothic architecture construction. At the same time, the two easternmost arcades in the nave were replaced by a bigger pair of bow, to make room for a rood screen, and a wooden vault instead of the flat ceiling covering the nave. The towering Gothic choir shows that the "mendicant" had abandoned all restraint in relation to the architecture of their churches. The construction of the choir begun soon after 1325. First, the Romanesque chancel was dismantled, followed by the construction on its foundations. The extremely ambitious dimensions of the building were designed in that phase. But already in the 1330s, the construction was set, and remained unfinished for years. The second phase of the building as it was planned, ended in a much more honest construction, and it was saved much substance of the Romanesque building, for example, almost the entire Romanesque transept remained. Historical events explain that change: the revolution of 1336 that Rudolf Brun and his entourage brought to power, was followed by a period of economic uncertainty reaching its peak with the plague of 1348/49, the persecution and killing of the Jewish citizens of the so-called Synagogengasse in 1349, as well as the "Zürich night of murder" (Mordnacht) in 1350, a failed counter coup of Brun's opposition under the son of Johann I (Habsburg-Laufenburg), Johann II. Unlike the Franciscan and the Augustinian orders, the Dominicans in Zürich pleaded to the Pope, another opponent of the political situation in Zürich, and therefore, the convent was forced to leave the city for several years. His exile led to Winterthur and Kaiserstuhl and finally to Rapperswil, those counts were the most prominent opponents of Brun's regime. This development represents the beginning of the general decline of the Zürich Dominican convent.

=== Roof structure ===
The roof work of the choir was built in two phases between 1317 and 1323 from east to west, as a rafter roof with collar beam position and cross strut. The approximately 28 metres (92 ft) long roof has a roof pitch of 57°, consists of 24 rafters and includes the polygonal upper fixation of the choir. The roof turret design was developed in 1496, and the belfry in 1475. Due to the strong inclination of the rafter container of about 97 centimetres (38.19 in), a pursuit of spruce and fir was set up in the 17th century. The roof structure was two times repaired what easily is recognizable. The first repair contained, among other things, the installation of the supporting struts, which stabilized the rafter container. Towards to the end of the 17th century, the second repair was implemented, which concentrated on the eastern chancel. The inclination of the entire roof work is originated by the pressure of the polygonal choir construction.

=== Ridge turret respectively bell tower ===
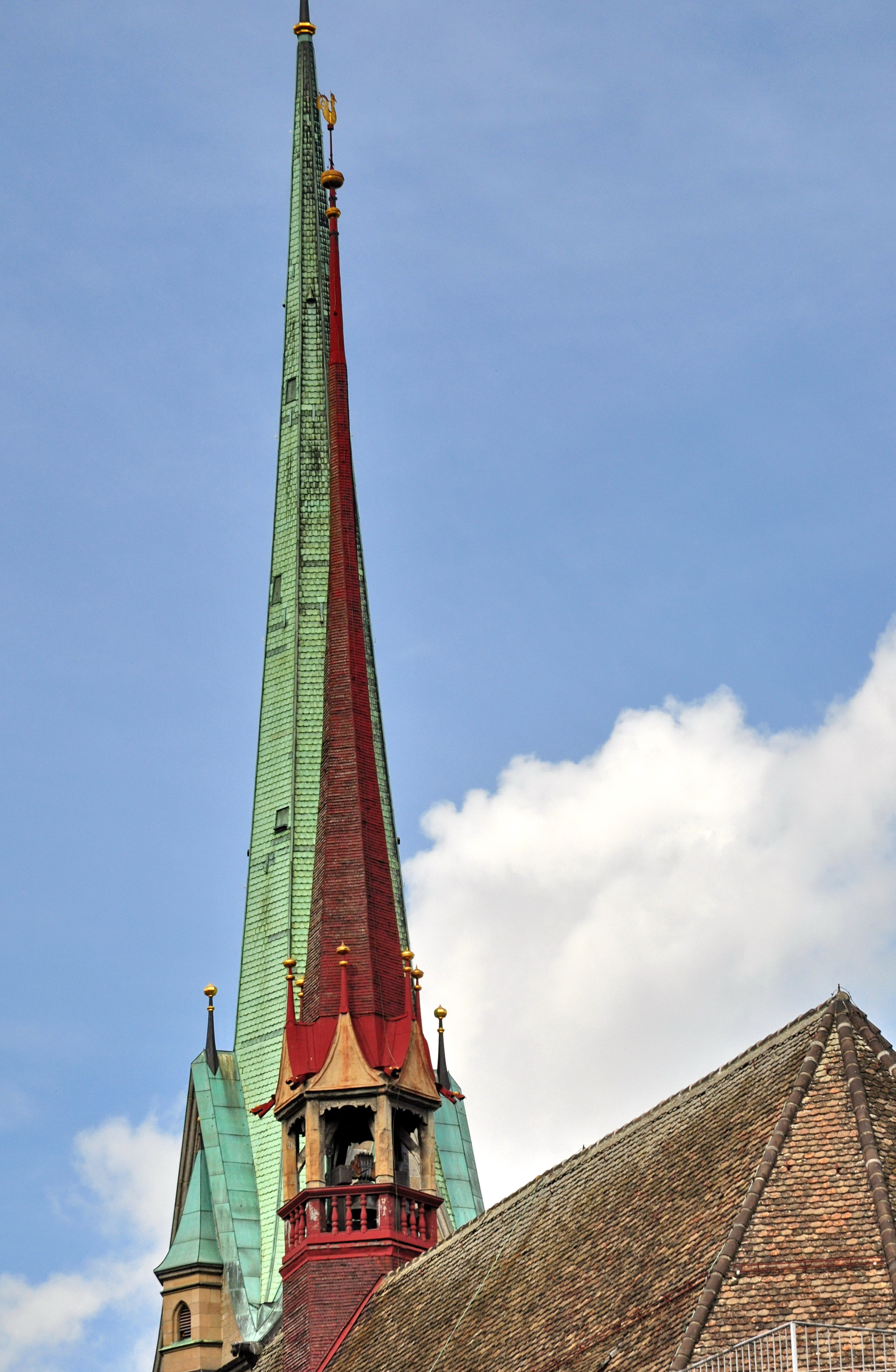
The 27.1 metres (88.9 ft) high ridge turret of Predigerkirche, and its 96 metres (315 ft) clock tower in the background

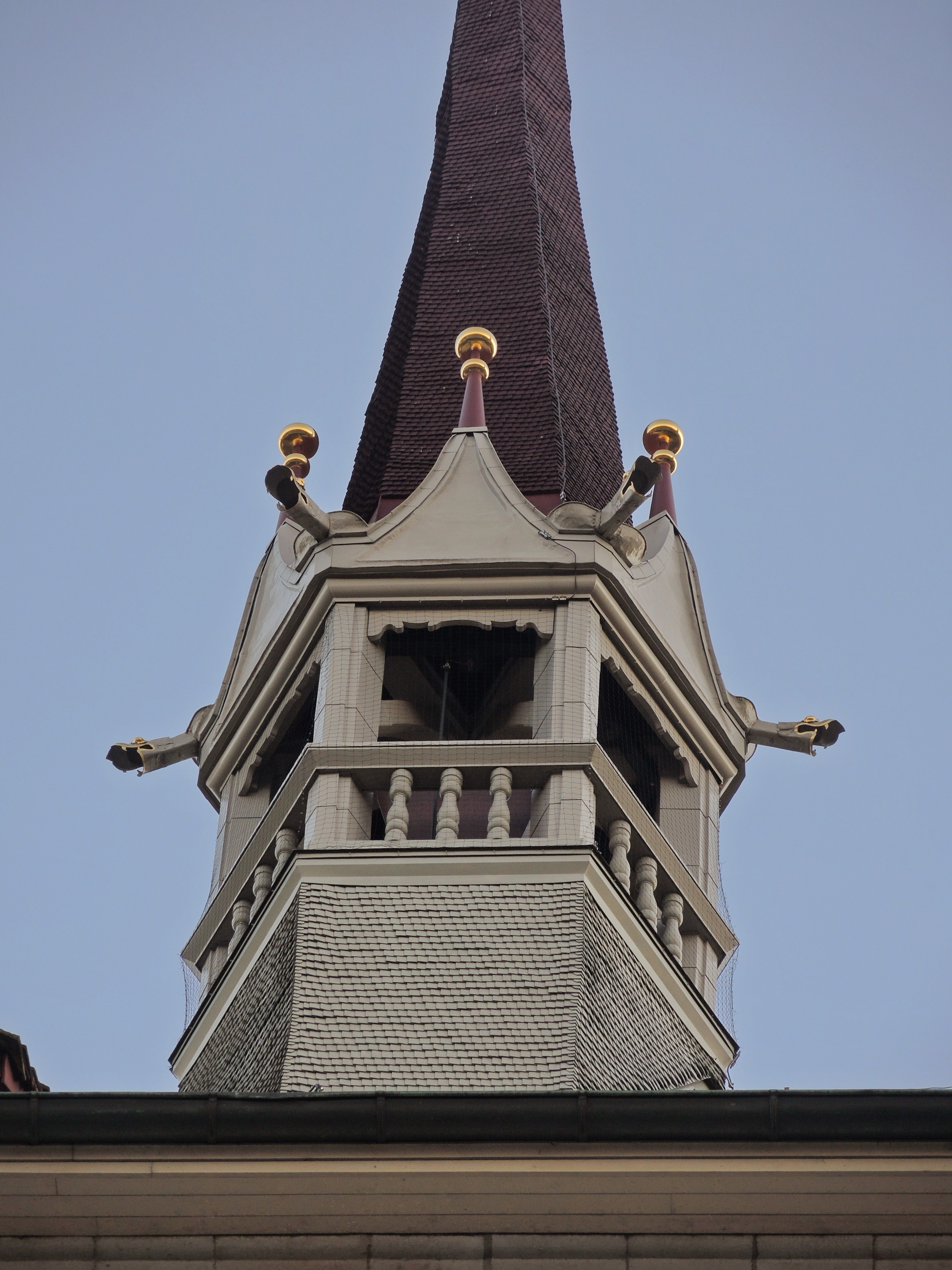

The 27.1 metres (88.9 ft) high, hexagonal ridge turret is made of oak, and a masterpiece of carpenter technology, towering above the roof ridge, at the same height as the walls of the choir. The dendrochronological analysis show that the belfry construction was done in 1475, which has arisen in the supporting structure of the choir, that was added in 1496. The roof shingles of the open belfry and the hexagonal pointed helmet have been applied in several layers on the wooden formwork. The latest dendrochronological provisions on wooden spire show that this wood was hit in 1628, and the roof turret was built in 1629, followed by several repairs. The bracing cross pieces of the lower frame structure are applied, while there are at the top of the cross pieces of wood mortise and tenon joints. The pediments over the open belfry are crowned with golden knobs, and the roof spouts are decorated with Gargoyles from painted copper sheets. The subsequent installation of two tie rods was done in 1778, and included the removal of the shingle at the bottom of the screen for the installation of tie rods, in order to stabilize the pointed helmet. These were anchored to the belfry and thus passed the bells vibrations directly to the construction of the turret's vault.

=== Church bell of 1451 ===
The bell in the roof turret dates from 1451 (inscription) and is in Zürich the oldest church bell at its original location. The bell is attached with metal bands, which are vertically inserted into the oak basement and into 35 centimetres (13.78 in) horizontal flat iron passes. The bell bearing is remarkable, as the bell's axis protruding from the ridge, unrolling on the hammer-shaped head, and the rolling distance when ringing the bell is only about 7 centimetres (2.76 in). To produce the transverse force connections to the bell axis, it is linked to the outlying platings and under the belfry floor fixed with wooden screws.

=== Baroque construction ===
The Reformation in Zürich was also a struggle of the opponents of the mendicant orders to win the favour of the citizens of Zürich. Zwingli forced disputations with combative sermons, the so-called pulpit-war; in spring of 1524 he banned the mendicant preaching, and on 3 December 1524 the repeal of the convents in Zürich was forced. The buildings of the Dominican convent were transferred to the then neighboring hospital that was the property of the city government, and the church was deconsecrated. A wall separates since 1541/42 the choir from the nave. In the Gothic choir, the probably then two upper wooden floors served as a grain warehouse, and on the ground floor, the hospital chapel was set up. The nave was used for five large wine presses. The choir was then divided by the catchment of five shelves so that worship for the residents of Niederdorf was held from 1544 until 1607. The upper floors of the choir were now used as the grain chute.

The Zürich council decided on 21 January 1607, to relocate the worship in the separate nave, and the nave was rebuilt in the Baroque style. A wooden barrel vault was moved and the walls and vaults were covered with stucco. The clerestory and the attic were increased and grown, and a magnificent portal with porch was built on the south side. The reconstruction was carried out from 1609 to 1614 in the early Baroque style – this construction essentially repeals the present appearance of the church building and its interior. It became the first really redesigned Protestant church in that era. The conception of this sermon space, and the pulpit placed in the middle of the front wall above the baptismal font, was the model for many churches.

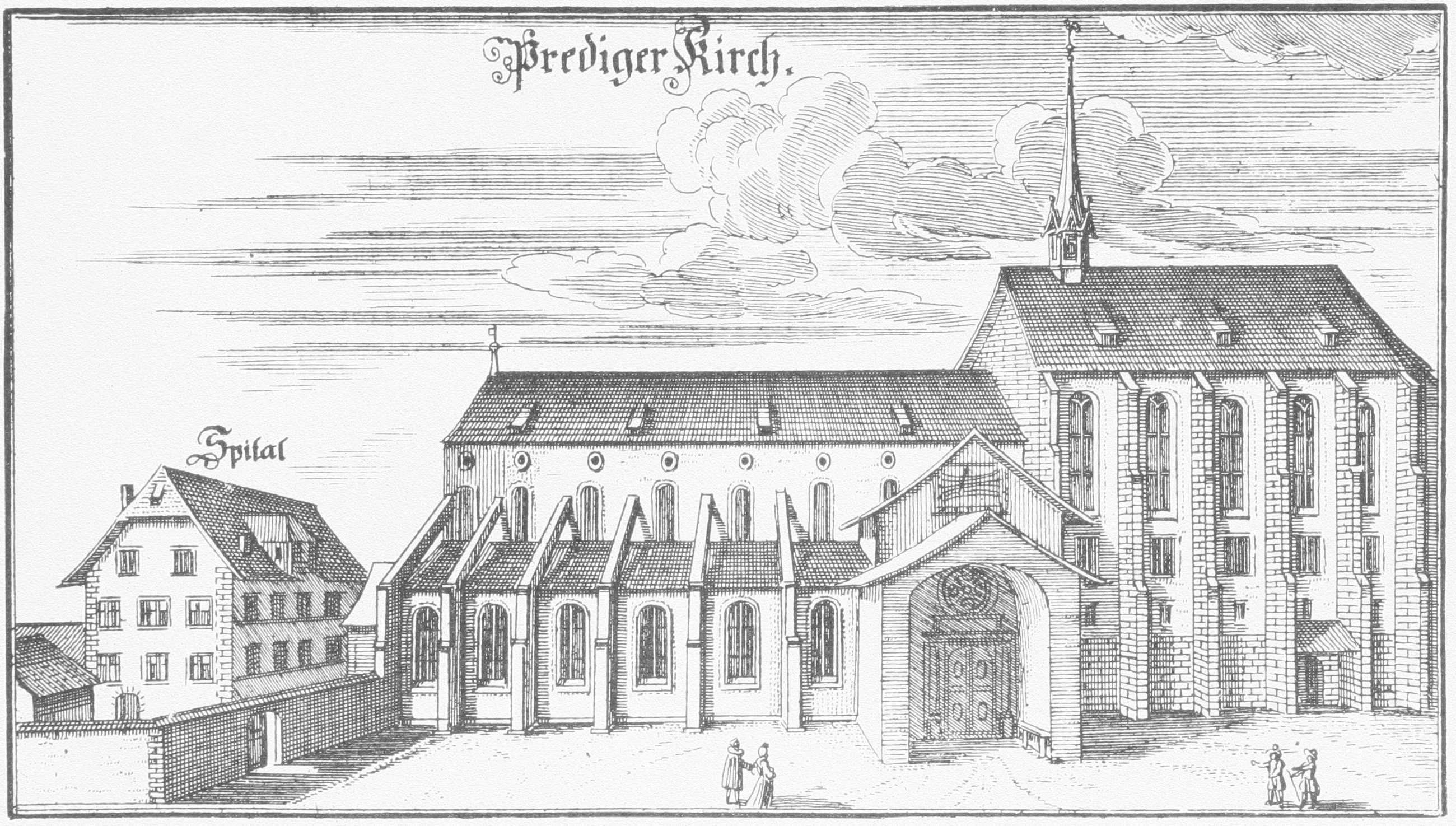
Baroque church and the hospital as of 1742

The most important structural changes affected the southern aisle whose southern wall was completely rebuilt with large pointed-arch windows. The two side aisles received a barrel vault and the nave. But the wooden vault above the nave weakened the structure of the church, so that in 1663, in terms of emergency, the still existing powerful buttresses had to be built, to support the southern facade. The increase of the high ship wall by 2 metres (7 ft) also was part of the same emergency measures, as well as a completely new roof. The new zone of the high ship wall was covered with round windows. The choir was once again used for storage purposes in the 19th century and served from 1803 as cantonal and University library. During the fire of 1887, the remaining convent buildings burnt down, as well as parts of the roof of the nave.

=== Conversions of 1871/73 until 1899/1900 ===
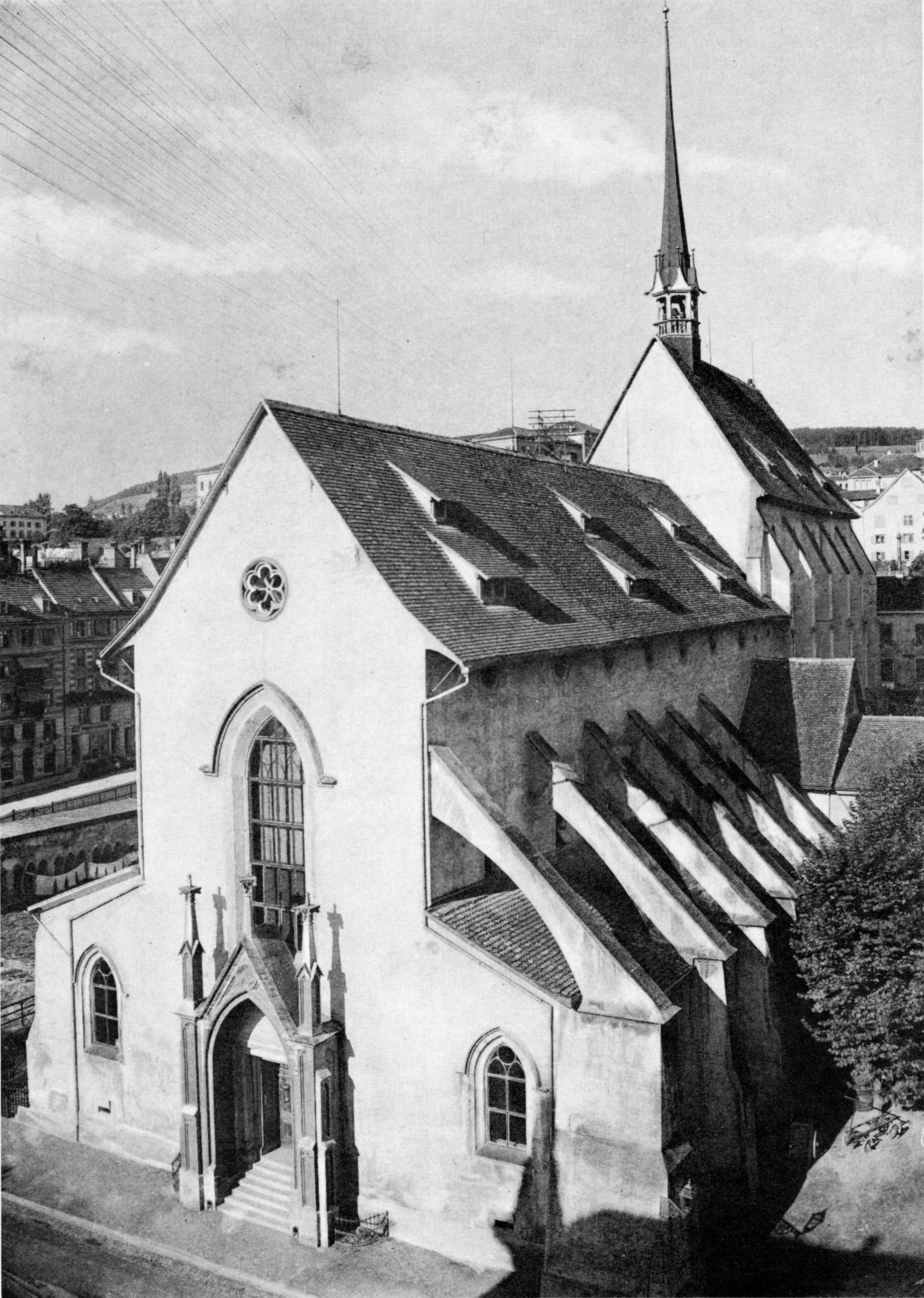
Photography of the church before the tower was built, probably in the late 1890s.

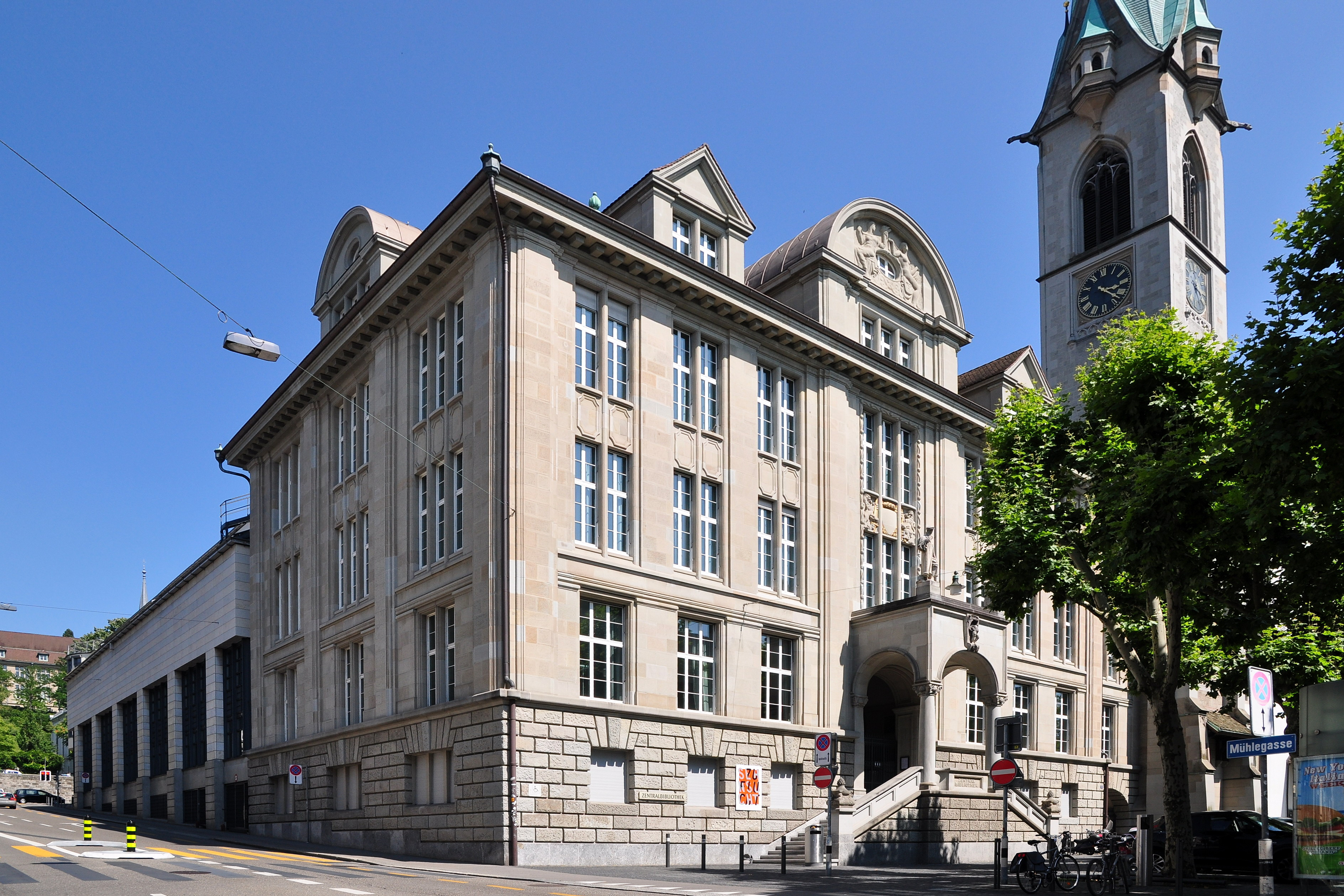
Zentralbibliothek at the location of the former monastery buildings

The former convent buildings were also used after the abolition of the monastery by the hospital. After the construction of the new hospital in 1842, they became the so-called "Versorgungsanstalt" where chronically ill, old and incurable mental patients were housed; the contemporaries complained unsustainable states were solved in 1870, when the Burghölzli sanatory was built. On occasion of the renovation, the still preserved northern transept arm of the Romanesque church was demolished and three new tracery windows were inserted in the so far windowless exempted choir. The convent buildings were sold in 1873 to the city of Zurich, which used it to house destitute citizens. In 1877/79 the western façade of the church was rebuilt, on the occasion of the conditioning of the tough. When the old convent buildings burned down on 25 June 1887, whose ruins were dismantled in the same year, and the open space was used for celebrations. The northern part of the church, that was detached since the demolition of the cloister buildings, also was new designed by adding aisle windows and pilasters. The stem of the southern portal, which was the main entrance to the church, has been cut and received a sloping roof and an arched position, and so the last connections between the Gothic choir and the former nave inside the church were closed.

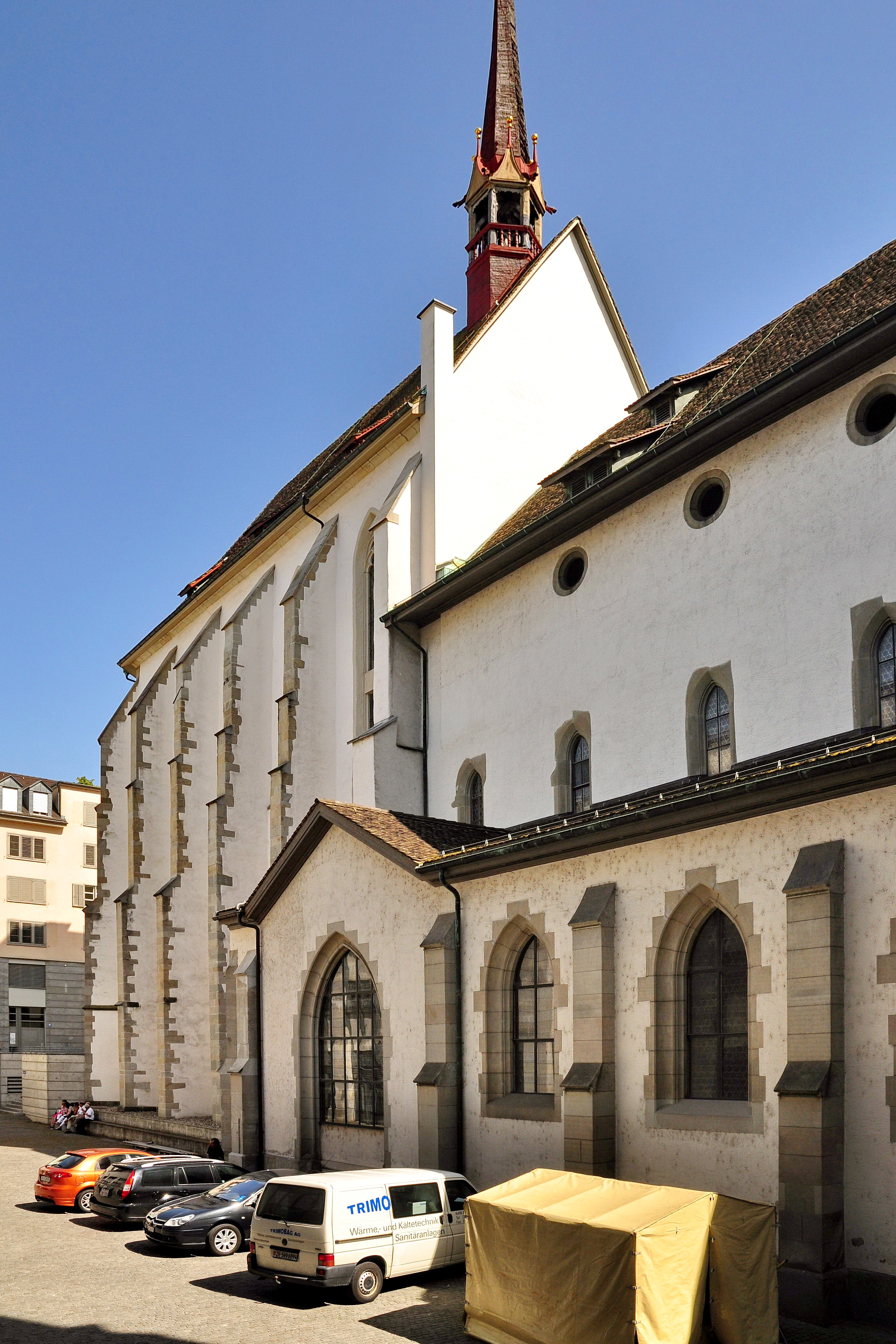
The exterior of the choir as seen from Zentralbibliothek

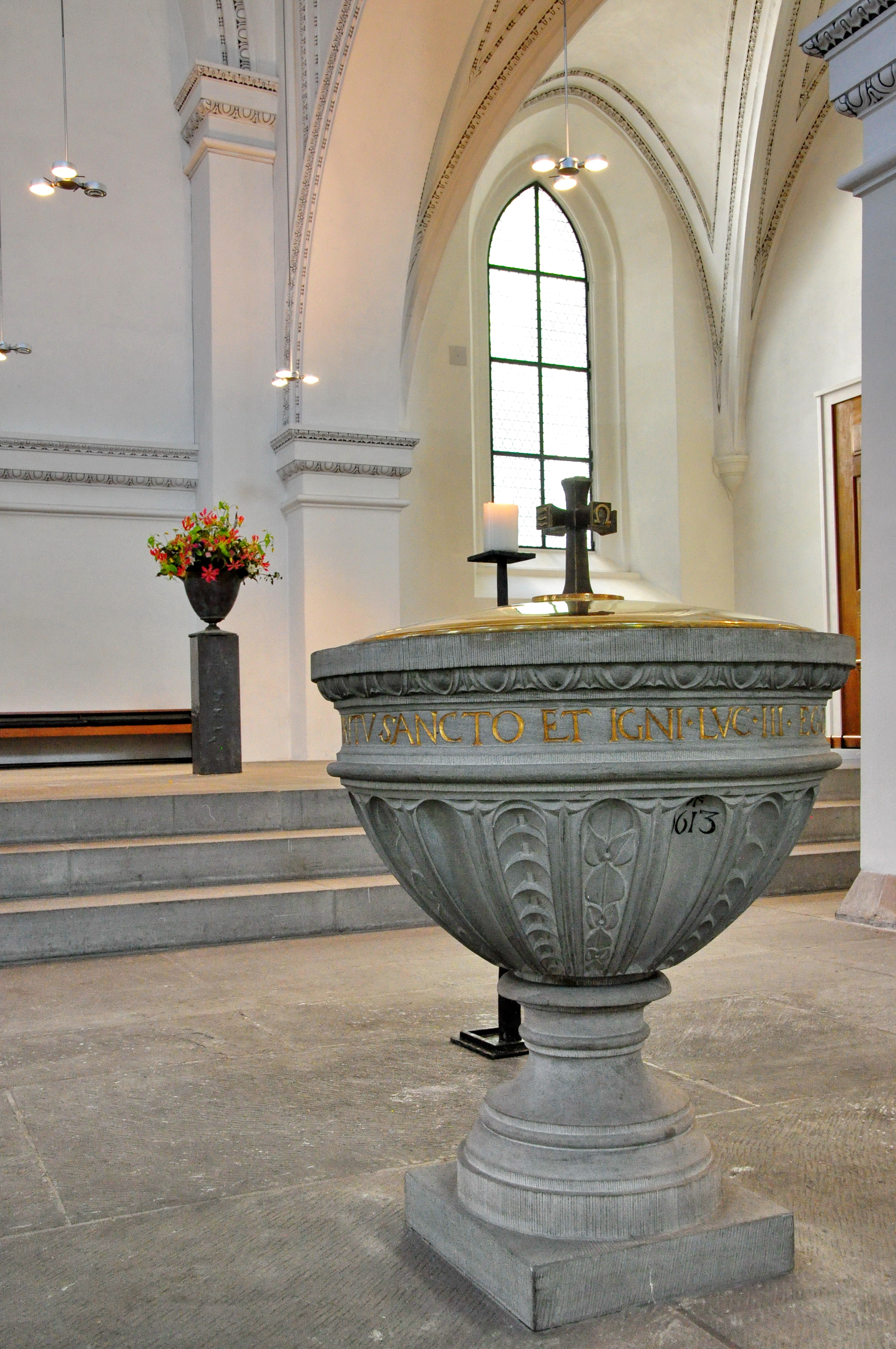
Baptismal font

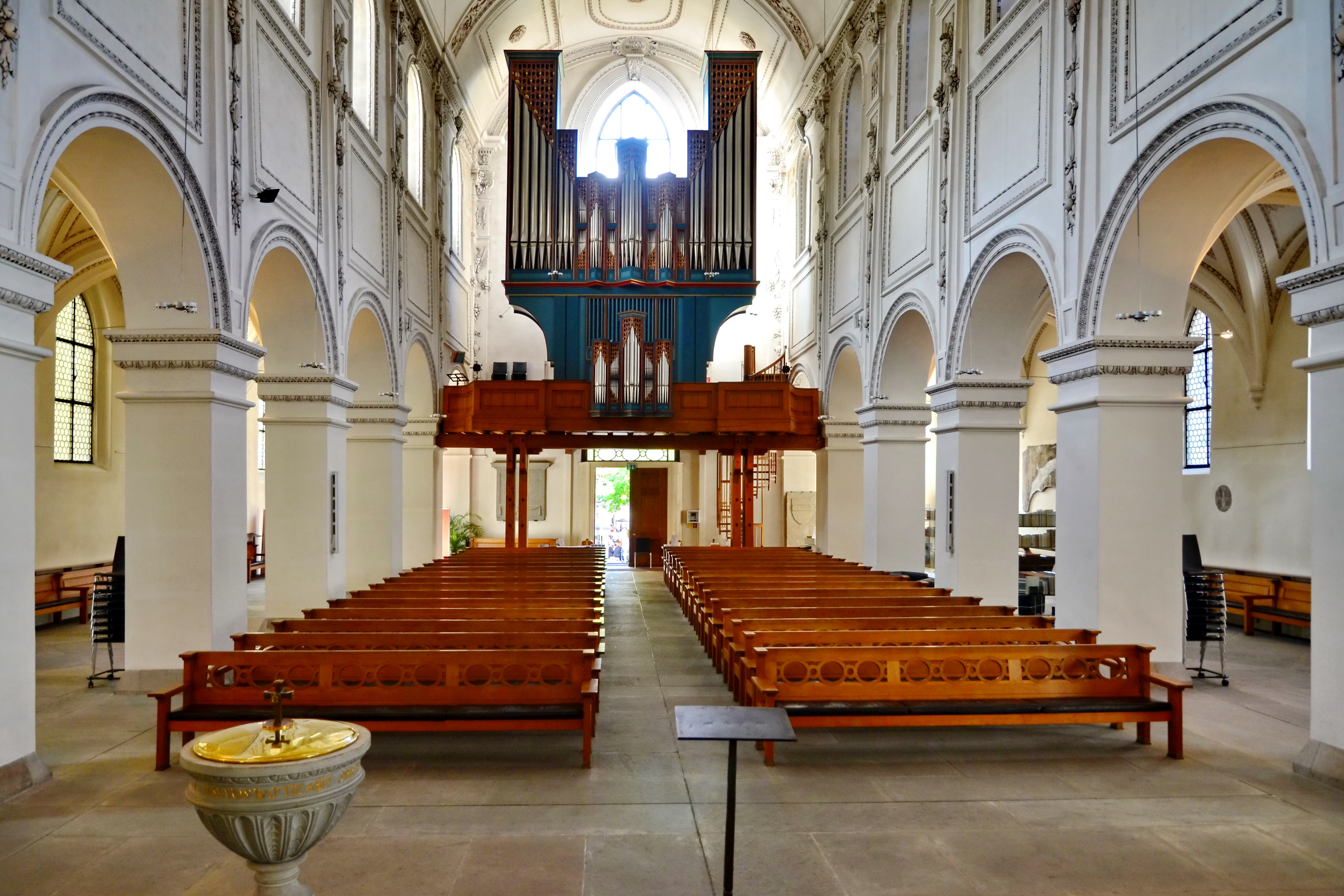
church interior towards the organ

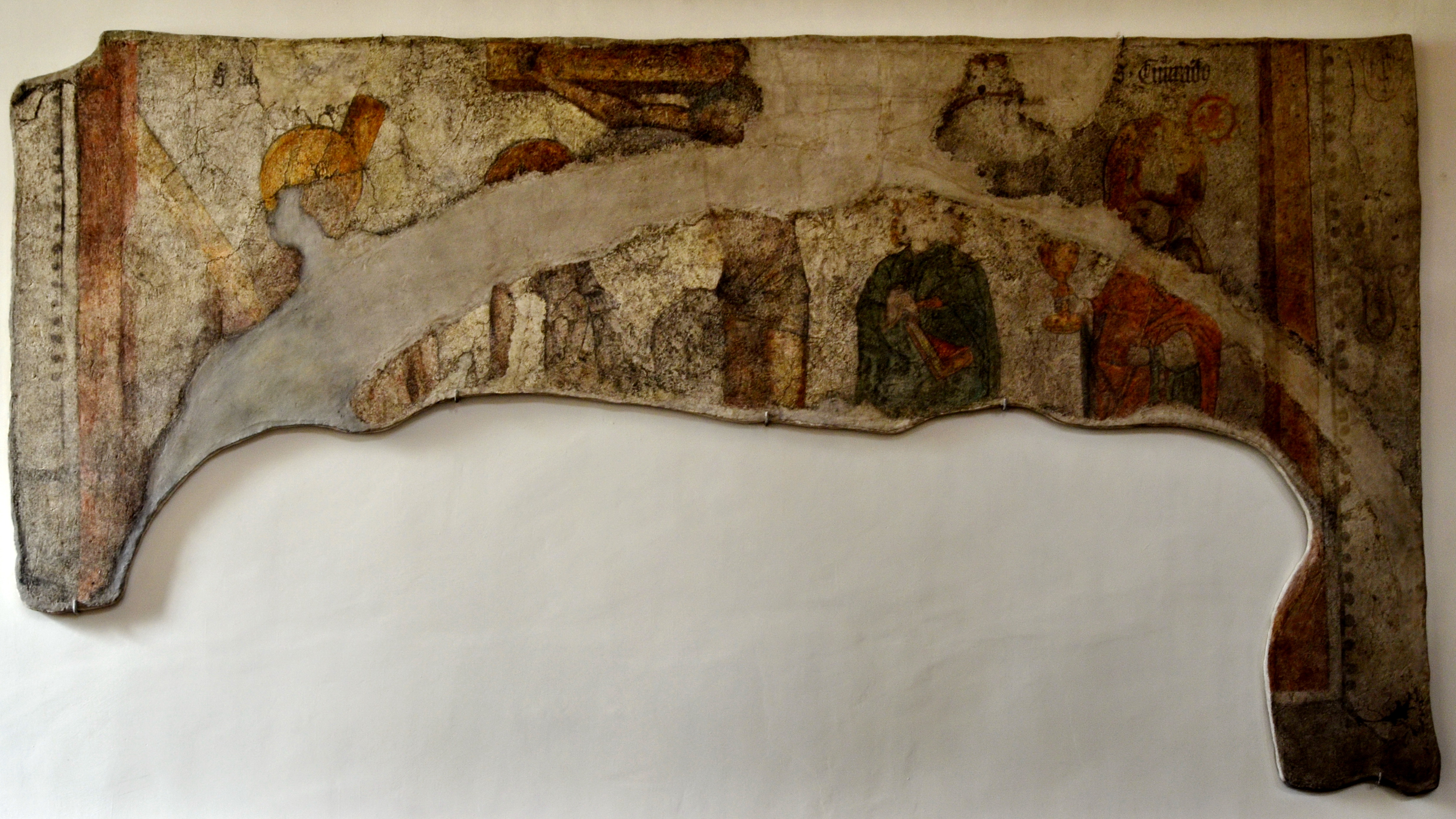
remains of the early 16th-century interior decoration

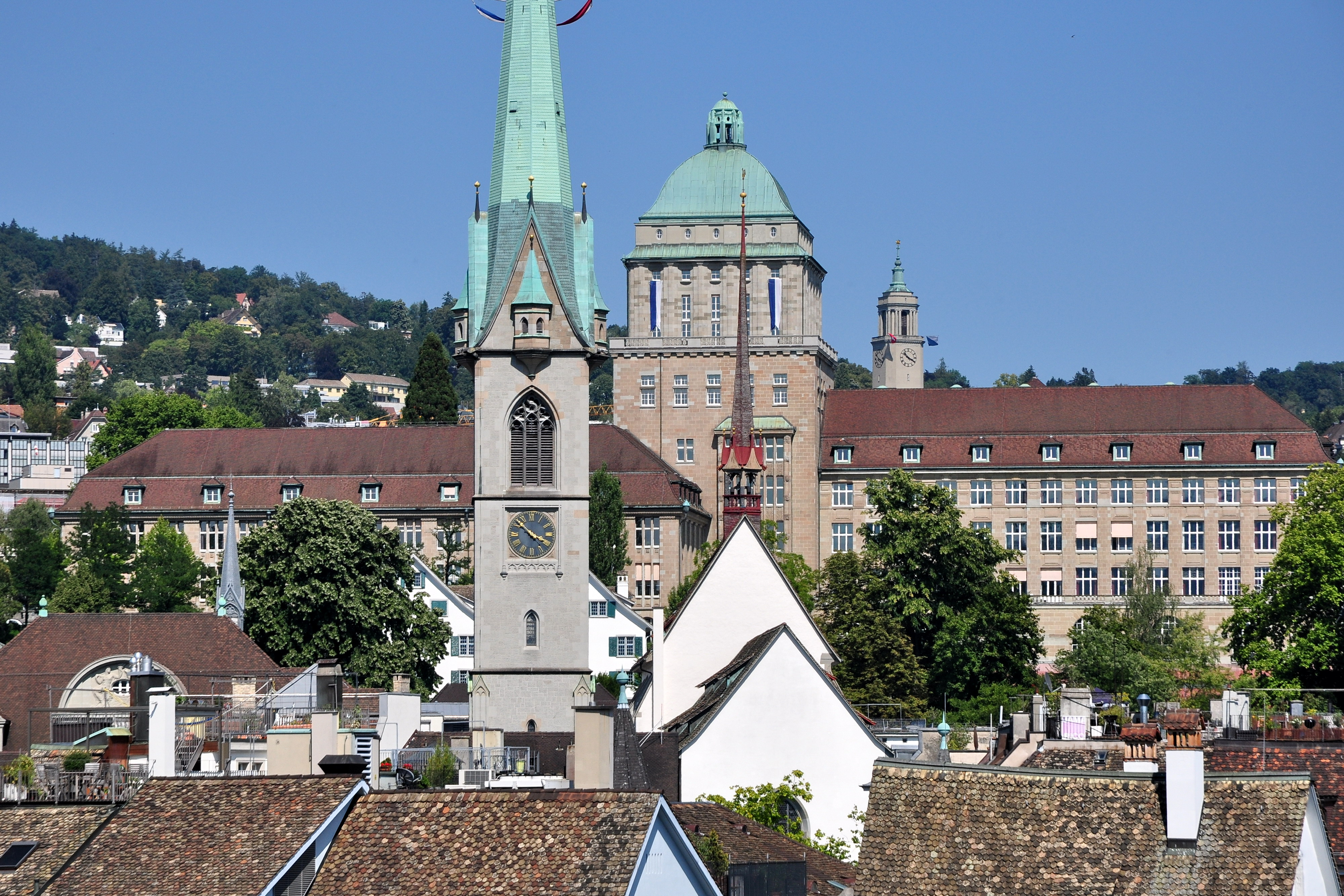
as seen from the Lindenhof hill

=== Church tower of 1900 ===
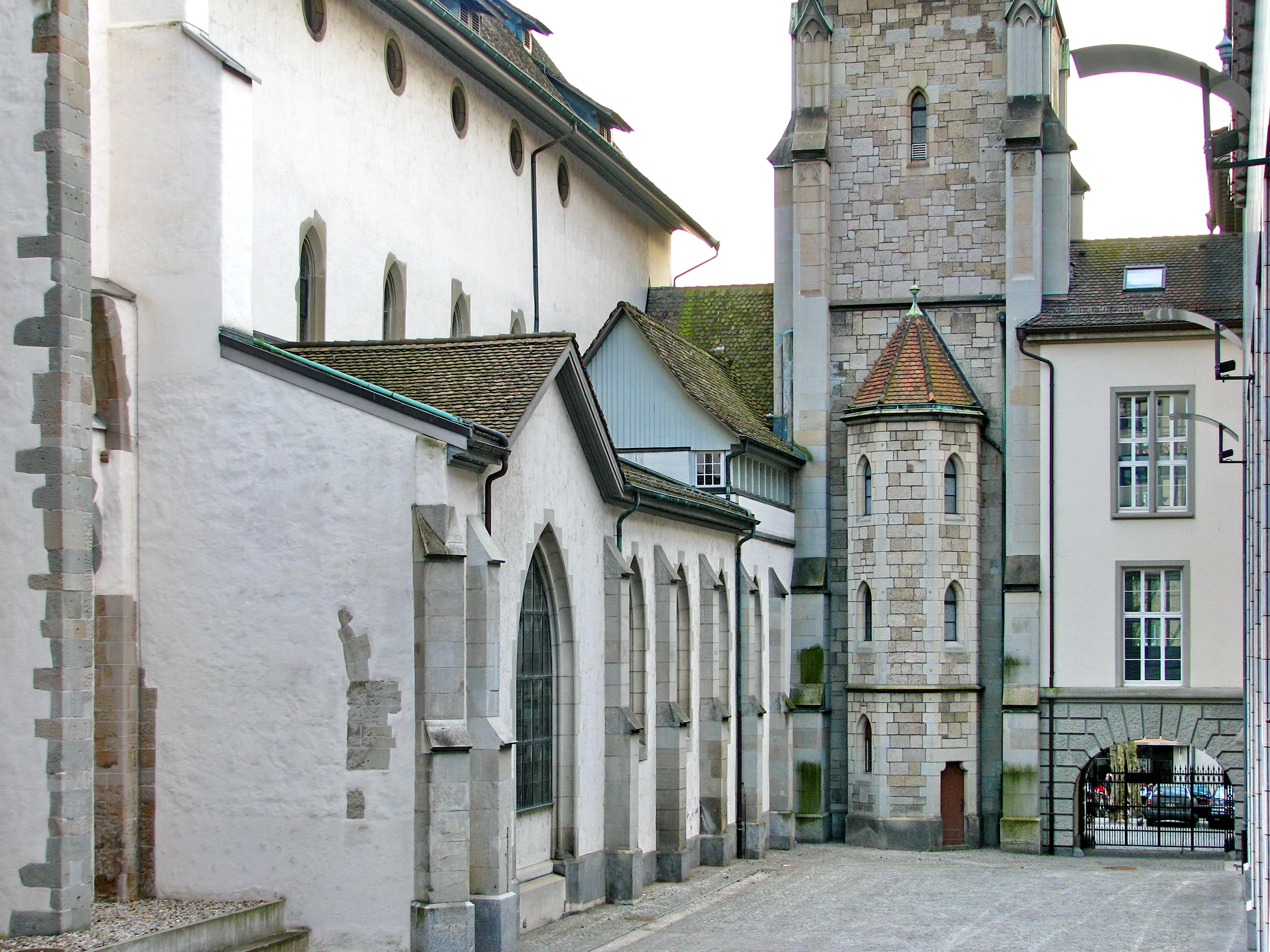
basement of the tower

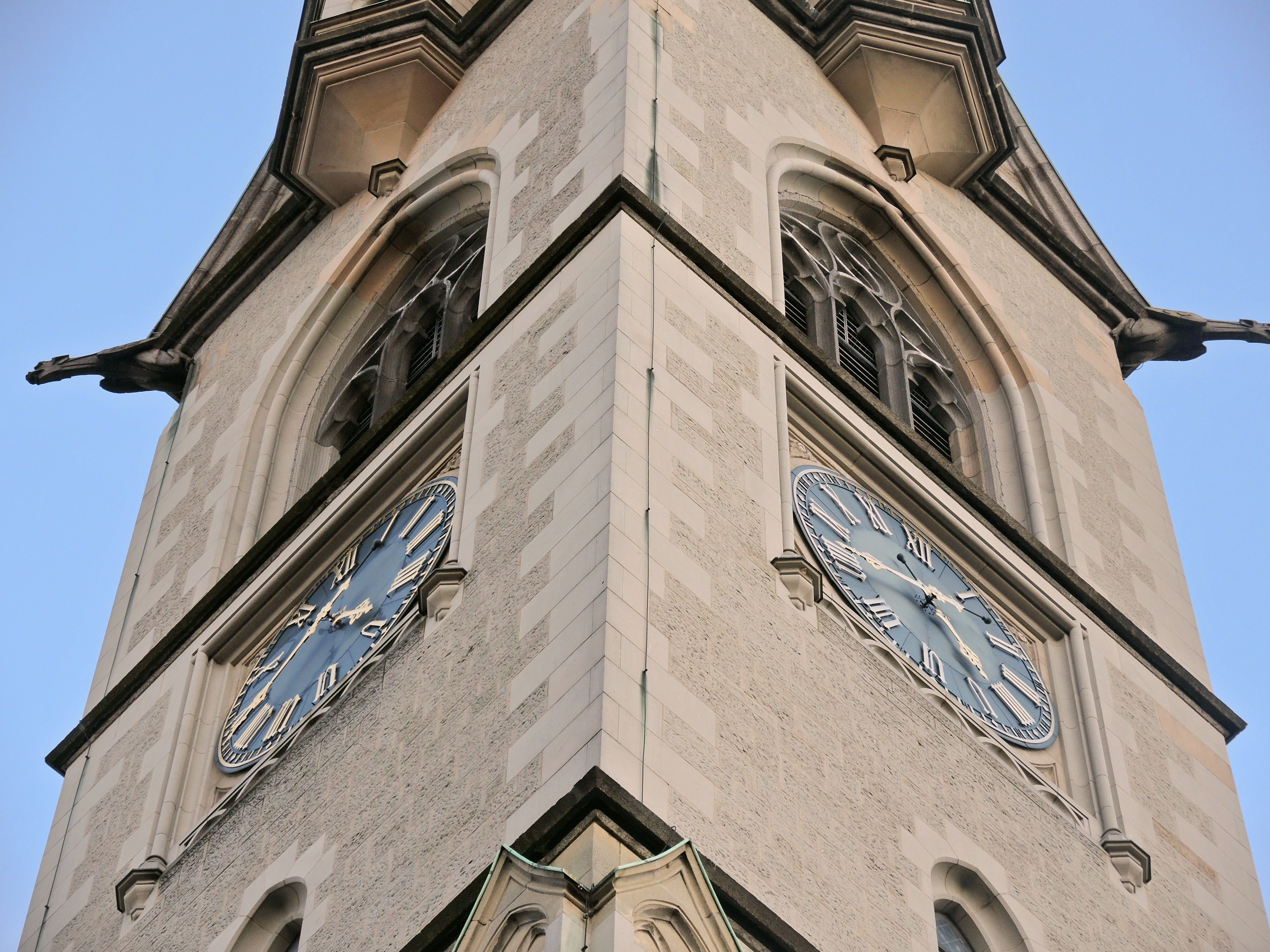
roof top as seen from Mühlegasse

The most important structural changes were new church windows in 1899, a new Gothic Revival style portal on the west facade, and the new tall church bell tower. The tower, by the architect Friedrich Wehrli, was begun in 1898 and completed in 1900 according to the plans of Stadtbaumeister Gustav Gull. The church tower was added after the demolition of the monastery's buildings on the southwest between the Zentralbibliothek (central library) and Predigerkirche (church). It is connected to the former cloister area and is accessible by a gate at its base. The church tower is a stylistic revival of Gothic architecture, particularly the Late Gothic cathedral towers of Grossmünster and Fraumünster. With its height of 96 metres (315 ft), it overtowers them by over 30 metres (98 ft).

Like the most present brownstone buildings in Zürich, it consists of a granitic sandstone of the lower freshwater molasse. The sandstone facade details and the four gables above the masonry were inspired by the choir of the church. The tower's roof is covered with copper tiles, the gables are covered with a wooden structure, so the 5.2 metres (17.1 ft) high spire weighs just 95 kilograms (209 lb).

Renovations of the church tower were made in 1920, 1931, 1957, and 1993, which were traditionally documented inside the tower ball.

== Contemporary restorations & renovations ==
=== 1960s to 2010s ===
In 1965−1967 the nave was restored, and the original west facade of the church building largely rebuilt and renovated. At that time the first studies of retaining the Gothic era abbey−choir building for the Zentralbibliothek Zürich (literally Zürich Central Library) or reuniting it with the former nave were done. In 1989 a fierce public debate rose on those options, culminating in a cantonal−wide referendum. The proponents for retaining it for civic use won the ballot referendum. In the 1990−1996 remodeling of the library, the choir was retained as part of the library, and houses its Musikabteilung (music collections department).

In 1974 the facade of the choir building was restored, and the shingles of the roof rider renewed. The leak and weathered roofing was replaced on the basis of existing records in the pointed knob with handmade impregnated roofing shingles. The hue of the top coat was held in an oxide-red tone. The bearing of the weather cock was made accessible, and the pommel balls over the gables and the tower were re-plated in gold.

On occasion of the state examination in 2008, there were various defects found in the roof work. The bell almost touched one side of the roof turret-bell tower, although this was to have been addressed in 2006 renovations. To avoid damage to the historic building, the weakened structural parts were restored, strengthened, and when necessary replaced. The hexagonal roof turret's pointed helmet had to be stabilized, and many components were in poor condition, the shingles were very brittle, there were cracked sheet metal seams, and the copper plate did not keep even slight pressure. The main reinforcements and restoration work in the choir building were completed in 2010.

=== 2012 restoration ===
In 2012 the choir building's owners, including Reformierte Kirchgemeinde Predigern (church congregation) and Zentralbibliothek (central library), and the city of Zürich's departments of Praktische Denkmalpflege' and Archäologie des Amts für Städtebau, commissioned the Gugler construction company to repair the roof's skylights during the summer season. The restoration work was designed and specified to last for a minimum of 50 years, to avoid any more repetitions of extensive structural work for decades. The renovations, repairs, and additions to the historic roof structure proceeded cautiously and with due diligence research, although both records of the supporting structure and documentation of previous restorations was lacking.

In collaboration with the city of Zürich, a 60 metres (197 ft) high scaffolding tower was erected. The southwest side hip rafters of fir wood roof of the plant had moisture damage due to leaking roof shingles. It was plated with two dry, one year stored spruce wood parts, that were cope planed, glued together and the cross-sectional dimensions of wood connected with wooden screws. In addition to the general repairs to the structural stabilization of the first stator, the fixing of the rafter positions took was effected. Collar beam and strut pairs were cut off or removed in the roof structure.

The respective opposite tower stands of the bell tower were stabilized with a total of three tie rods, and no longer repairable oak timbers were replaced. The iron forged bolt lugs and nails ware extensively restored and reused. The wooden surfaces of the tower threshold ring, the moisture damage and the weakened old anchoring system of hexagonal roof turret-pointed helmet, required extensive reinforcements and repair measures, so that the existing bell bearings could be obtained.

The new roof shingles of the bell tower consist of radially to the root-derived spruce wood, which has been pressure treated prior to assembly. The shingles were placed on the hexagonal spire and the tower shaft offset strengthened with 0.8 millimetres (0.0315 in) thin lead plates, so-called nouques. The shingles were painted with the color Caput Mortuum V (Violet), based on the color analysis on the roof turret itself, on research in the city archives and based on color of the tower of the church and the sandstone used in the choir.

The crowning feature (knobs) and the lip contours, eyes and teeth of the Gargoyles were covered with gold leaf. The costs amounted to 1.1 million Swiss Francs.

== Pipe organ ==
The first pipe organ was installed in 1503 and 24 years later broken in the aftermath of the Reformation struggle. The first early Baroque Protestant church in the southern German culture area is mentioned in 1614, so it is assumed that the organ may have been re-used. In 1879 the first new organ after the Reformation was installed, and in 1911 the organ was enlarged by Goll und Kuhn. In 1923 it was replaced by a new organ.

The organ in the gallery was built by Paul Hintermann and Jakob Schmidt on behalf of Kuhn Orgelbau in 1970:

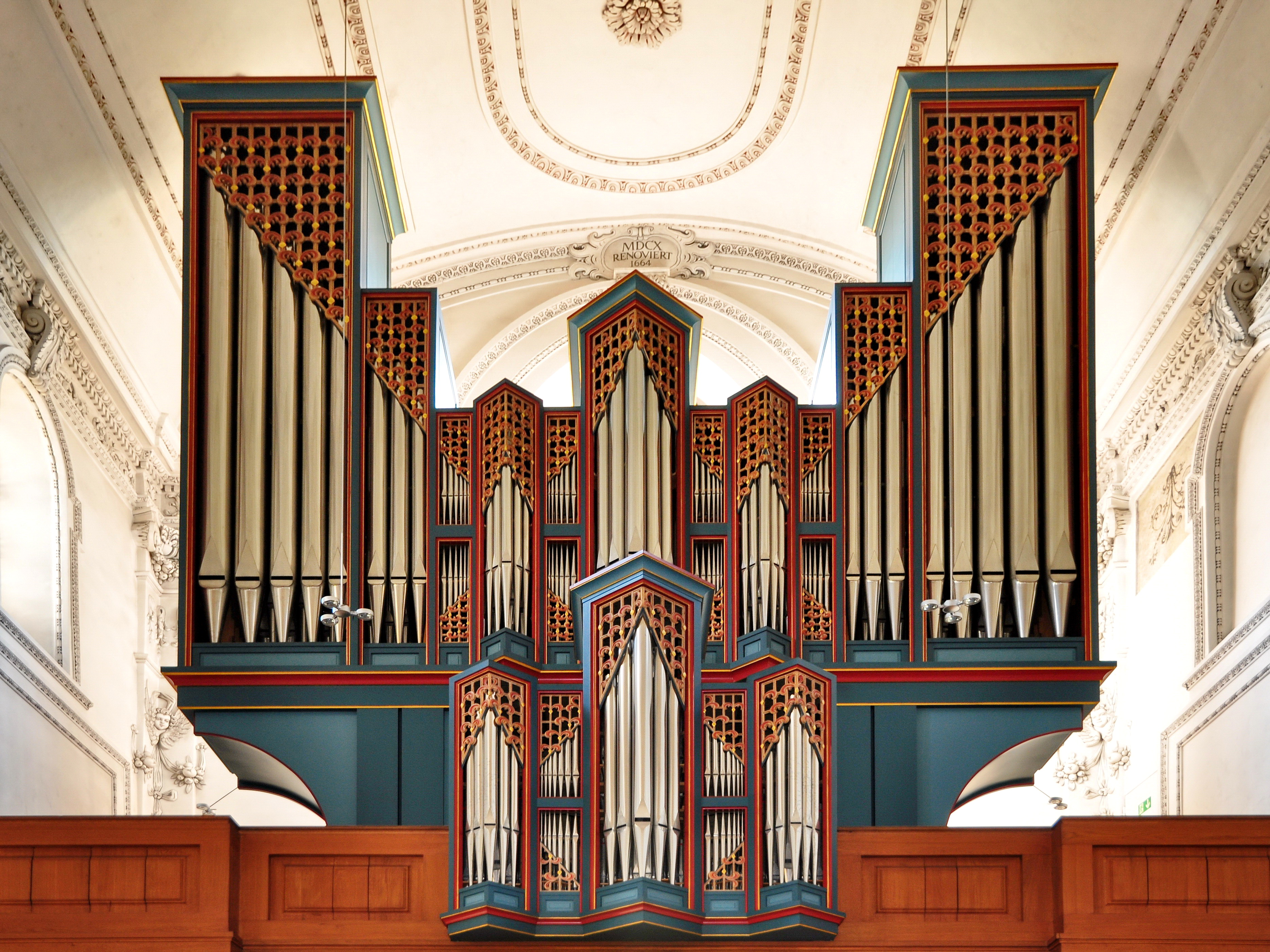

I Choir C–g^{3}
| Gedackt | 8′ |
| Quintatön | 8′ |
| Principal | 4′ |
| Blockflöte | 4′ |
| Sesquialtera 2f. | 2^{2}/_{3}′ |
| Octave | 2′ |
| Quinte | 1^{1}/_{3}′ |
| Scharf 3f. | 1′ |
| Krummhorn | 8′ |
| Tremulant |

II Great C–g^{3}
| Pommer | 16′ |
| Principal | 8′ |
| Suavial 1) (ab c) | 8′ |
| Koppelflöte | 8′ |
| Viola di Gamba | 8′ |
| Octave | 4′ |
| Spitzflöte | 4′ |
| Quinte | 2^{2}/_{3}′ |
| Superoctave | 2′ |
| Mixtur 4f. | 1^{1}/_{3}′ |
| Cymbel 3f. | ^{1}/_{2}′ |
| Cornett 5f. ( ab f) | 8′ |
| Trompete | 8′ |

III Swell C–g^{3}
| Holzgedackt | 8′ |
| Salicet | 8′ |
| Schwebung (ab c) | 8′ |
| Principal | 4′ |
| Rohrflöte | 4′ |
| Nazard | 2^{2}/_{3}′ |
| Waldflöte | 2′ |
| Terz | 1^{3}/_{5}′ |
| Sifflöte | 1′ |
| Mixtur 4f. | 1′ |
| Dulcian | 16′ |
| Schalmei | 8′ |
| Vox humana | 8′ |
| Tremulant |

Pedal C–f^{1}
| Untersatz | 32′ |
| Principalbass | 16′ |
| Subbass | 16′ |
| Octavbass | 8′ |
| Spillflöte | 8′ |
| Octave | 4′ |
| Nachthorn | 4′ |
| Mixtur 5f. | 2′ |
| Posaune | 16′ |
| Zinke | 8′ |
| Klarine | 4′ |

The slider chests instrument has 46 registers on three manuals and pedals. 1) floating, comp system with 6 combinations.

The Kuhn organ of 1970 will be supplemented by a second one, built in 1886 by James Conacher in Huddersfield in northern England, probably in spring 2015.

The church organ is owned by the Kirchgemeinde Predigern, and used by the Kantorei zu Predigern. The "Mittagsmusik im Predigerchor" concert series is administrated and partially published by the Musikabteilung.

== Abbey—Choir building ==
=== Grave plate of 1270 ===
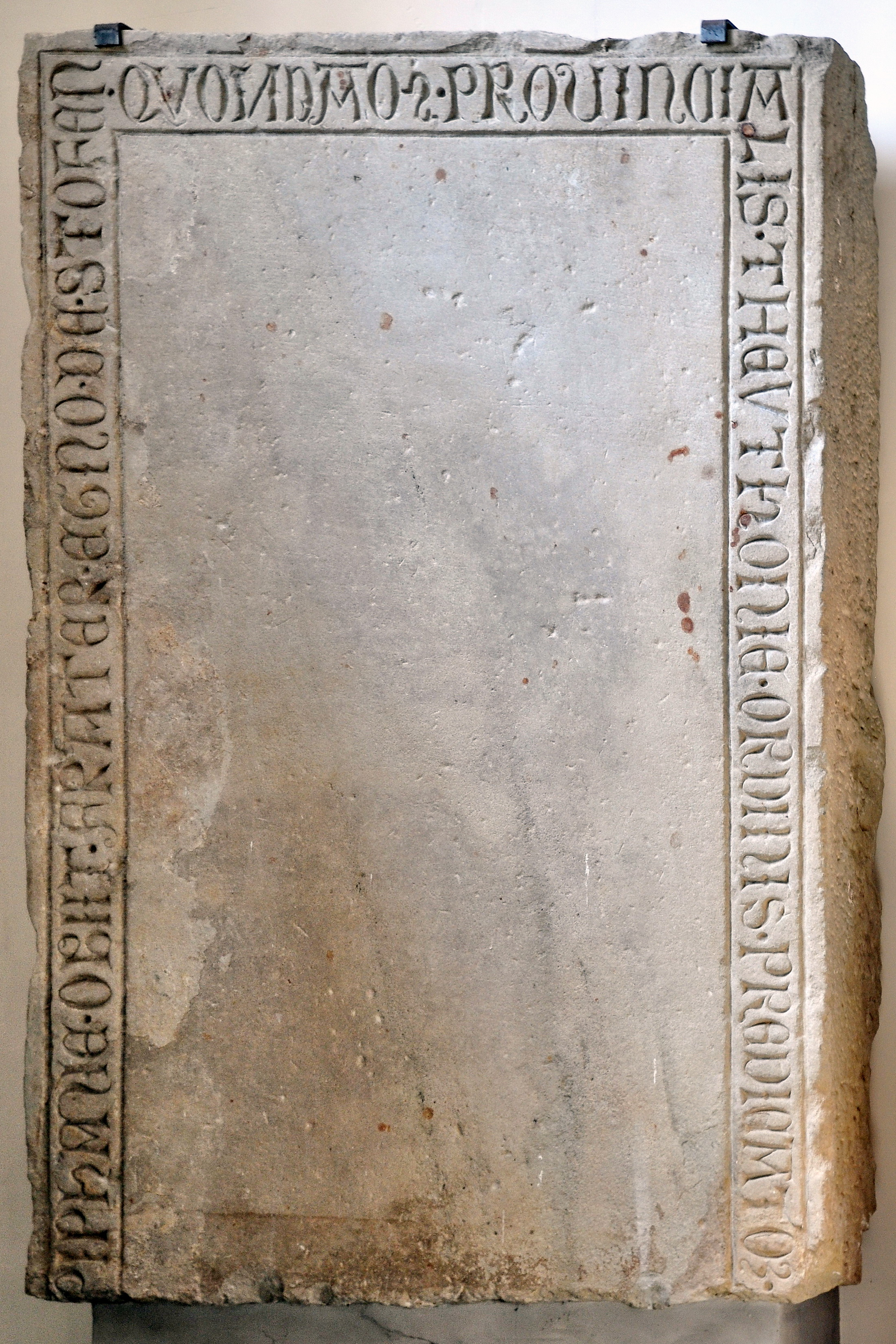
"Hie est sepultus frater Heinricus de Ruchenstein", buried as a member of the ministerially of the House of Rapperswil around 1300 AD, ledger stone made of Bollingen sandstone.

On the north side of the choir building, above the vault shell, the 14th century entrance door to the roof of the Gothic era choir was rediscovered in 1941. The older Romanesque period grave plate was in use as the lintel of the door opening, with its inscribed side facing down. The door jambs and the lintel (repurposed grave plate) were installed with other masonry work during the 14th century construction of the choir building. The grave plate has been walled up there for its future use. It was a remnant of the earlier Romanesque choir building. The machined surface is 74 centimetres (29.1 in) wide, 114 centimetres (44.9 in) respectively 130 centimetres (51.2 in) high; at the foot of about 700 kilograms (1,500 lb) grave plate is a defect. The thickness of the plate is 17 centimetres (6.7 in) at its left and 9 centimetres (3.5 in) at its right side. The material is sandstone from the Buechberg or Bollingen area on Obersee lake share. The backside is not processed, above a seven-petaled flower without hickeys is engraved, the length of each blade is 16 centimetres (6.3 in).

Ruchenstein or Galgenen called himself a ministeriality of the House of Rapperswil, mentioned with Rudolf and Ulrich von Galgenen to 1229. Brother Heinrieh von Galgenen (von Ruchenstein) "Frater ordinis predicatorum domus Turicensis" appears as a member of the Dominican convent in Zürich. The inscription "Hie est sepultus frater Heinricus de Ruchenstein" is 70 centimetres (27.6 in) long, and the letters are alternating 9 centimetres (3.5 in) and 8 centimetres (3.1 in) in height. Particularly noteworthy are the stem tubers with majuscule T and I of the early Gothic font type. The font differs sharply from the type of the 11th and 12th century AD, being an early stage of this new phase of development of writing that uses the second third of the 13th century, and was previously represented in the southern part of the Diocese of Constance only by two known examples. Slightly younger is the inscription on the grave stone of Ulrich Regensberg, also used as part of a wall construction in the Oetenbach monastery and dated to 1290/1300, and the endowment inscription of about 1302 in the Zwölfbotenkapelle of Grossmünster, as well as the murals in the Grimmenturm, which arose before 1307. In the arrangement of the inscription is particularly noteworthy of short, on three lines distributed text, the absence of the date and the absence of a peripheral edge inscription, as well as the simple cross. The seven-leaved rosette is not released. Related to the classification of the piece in the eastern Switzerland epigraphy, it is the oldest surviving piece of this kind, and the oldest surviving grave plate in Zürich.

=== Zentralbibliothek Zürich − Central Library ===
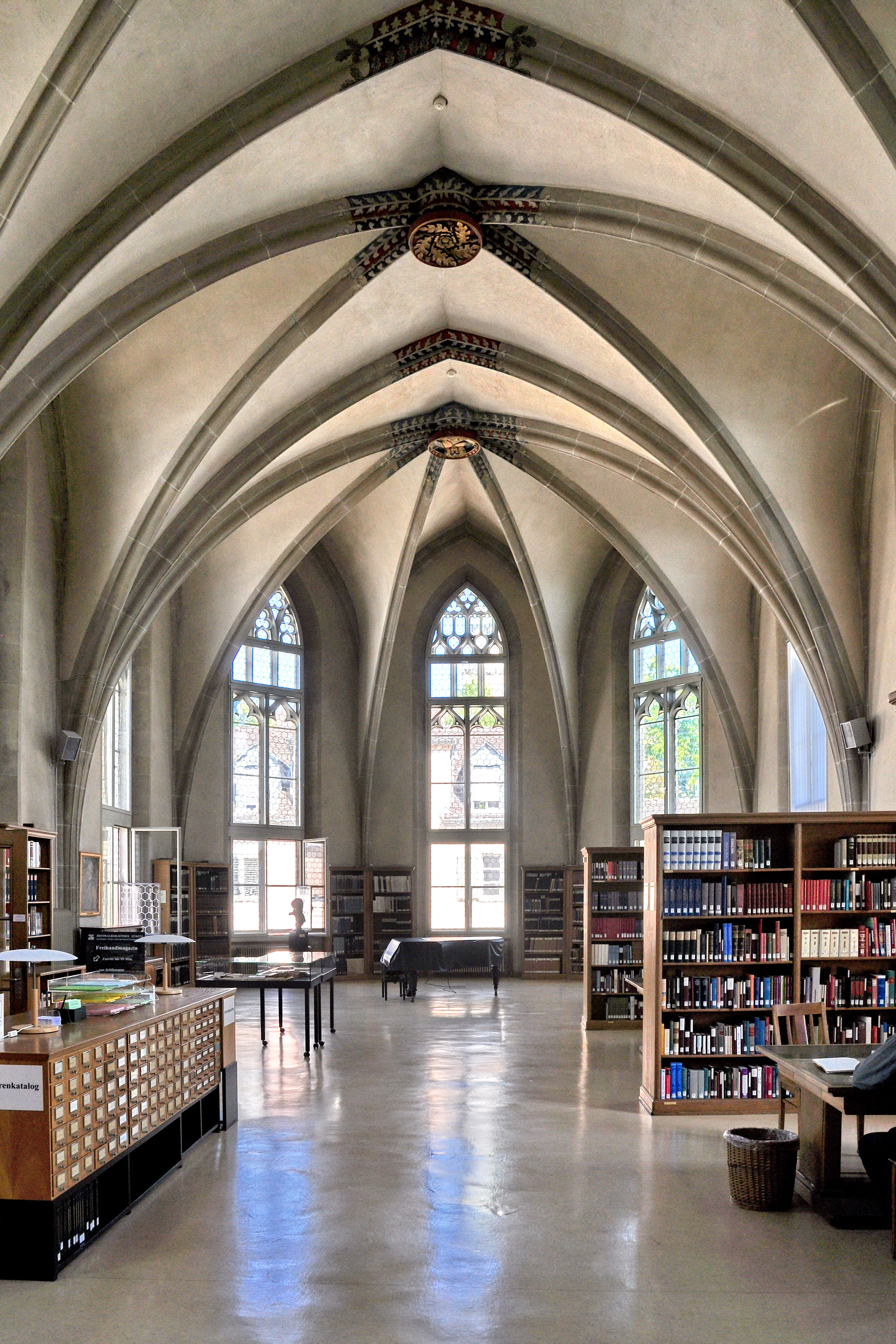
Musikabteilung in the choir building, Zentralbibliothek respectively former Staatsarchiv Zürich.

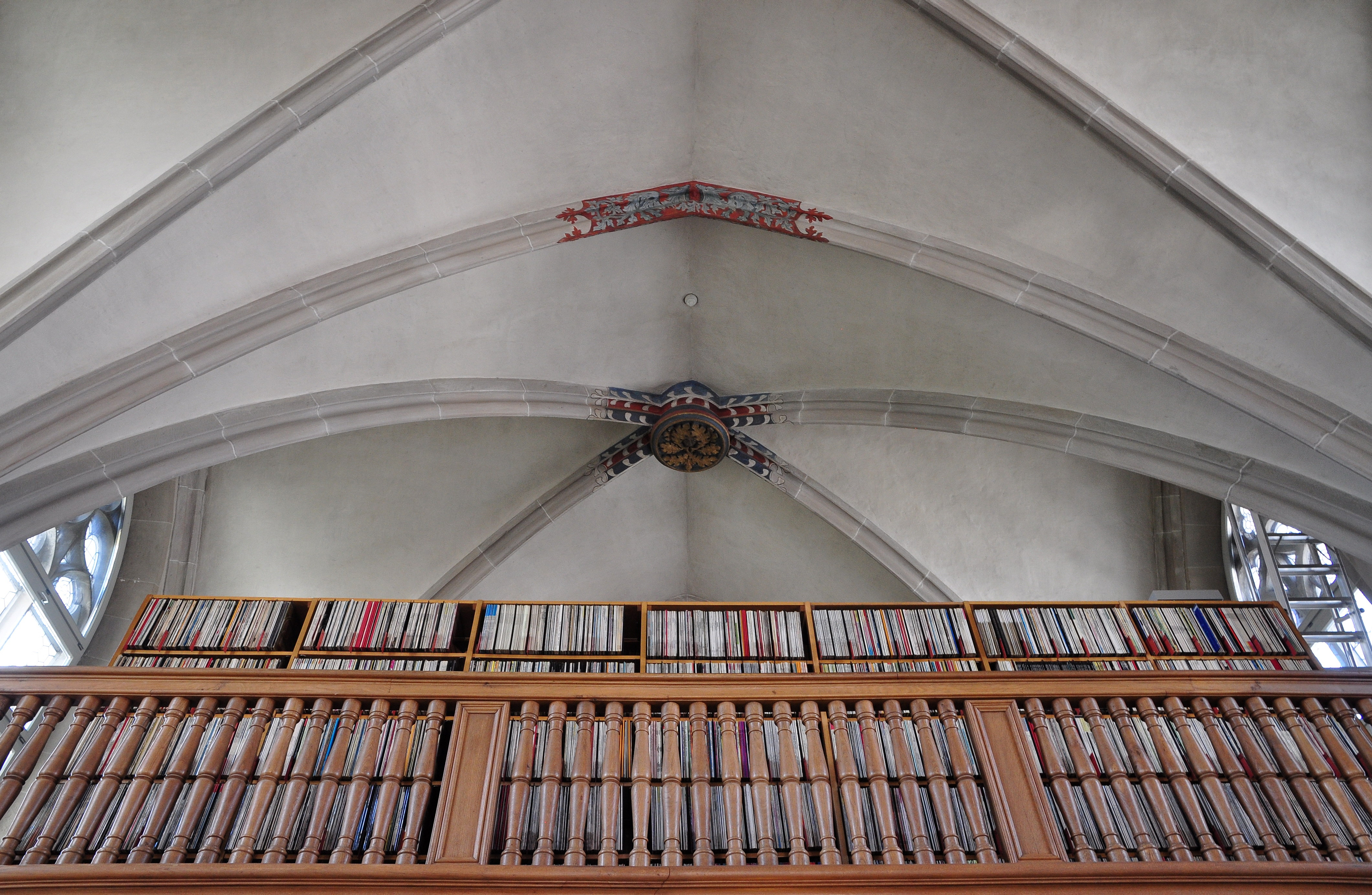
the choir's vault, Musikabteilung

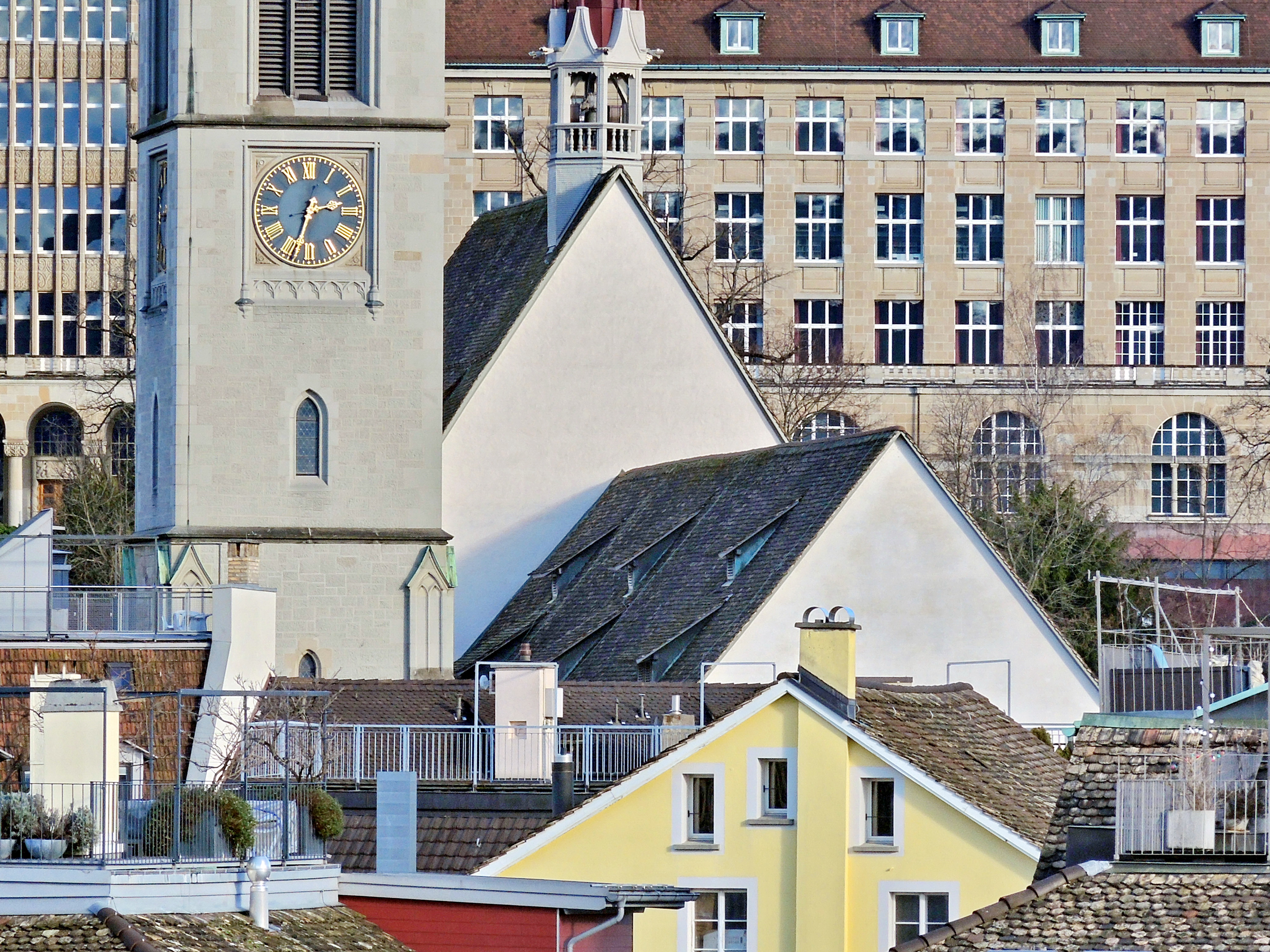
The 1900s tower, choir and nave in the foreground, as seen from the Lindenhof hill plateau.

The abbey−choir building had been used for secular purposes since the 16th century Protestant Reformation, and was transformed by the installation of shelves into a warehouse building. For several centuries it was used as a granary. Since 1914 the choir building has been administrated by the Zentralbibliothek (Zürich central library), the main library of both the canton, city and the University of Zürich. From 1919 to 1982 it also housed the Staatsarchiv Zürich (state archives of the Canton of Zürich), before they moved to the Irchelpark campus of the University of Zürich.

The Zentralbibliothek Zürich (literally Zürich Central Library) in the Predigern's choir passed over from the church to the University of Zürich to the "agreed plans for library purposes" according to the "treaty between the Canton of Zürich and the City of Zürich regarding the establishment of a Central Library, from 10 December 1910". On 28 June 1914, the citizens of Zürich agreed to the establishment of the Zentralbibliothek, that was according to the plans by Hermann Fietz was built between 1914 and 1917, situated at the former site of the old monastery buildings. Because the wooden shelves were seen as a security risk, they were replaced in 1918/19 by a concrete construction, though already at that time there were objections against this plan. The book magazine built on the place of the old cloister, now directly connected to the Gothic choir and making the 1871 exemption for the time being reversed. From 1917 to 1919, the final transformation of the choir to library purposes took place, and in 1919 the choir was leased to the Canton of Zürich, and so the cantonal library was outsourced, however in 1919 moved back and again moved, to make room for the as of today Staatsarchiv des Kantons Zürich. Therefore, since 1982 the premise is used for the library, in particular for its Musikabteilung, meaning the music department of the University of Zürich.

By the cantonal Hochbauamt (literally: building construction department) the construction works were performed in the Prediger choir in March 1941, mainly in the roof of the choir, where in setting up a makeshift lighting, a medieval grave stone was discovered in the attic, which was walled up there. The door served until 1887 as access to the floor space of the church and the choir was associated with a raised staircase growing on the north side of the choir. The then burned down stair access to the administration building, was not rebuilt 1887. As a result, the doorway was isolated respectively obsolete, and therefore separated from the church with a 25 centimetres (10 in) thick brick wall. The grave plate was taken out by the Hochbaudepartement and placed in the reading room of the archives.

=== Musikabteilung − Music Department ===
Since 1914 the choir has been administrated by the Zentralbibliothek (Zürich central library). Since 1996 the library's Musikabteilung (music collections department) has been located in the choir. The Musikabteilung was founded in 1971, as a scholarly music collection of European importance.

In addition to larger stocks of printed music and sound recordings, it compromises one of the largest Wagnerian collections in the world, and has become a major repository of Swiss music manuscripts. The collection includes around 180 legacies of deceased composers, musicians, and musicologists. It also houses corporate archives and historical library collections of important music institutions such as the Opernhaus Zürich, the Konzerthalle concert hall, the Zürich conservatory, and the Allgemeine Musikgesellschaft (AMG) record label.

The music department publishes the materials in its collections periodically as CDs and online. The repertoire ranges from early 16th-century spiritual music of Huldrych Zwingli's 15th century to the late 20th century. The music collection is released under the label "Musik aus der Zentralbibliothek Zürich", as well as "Mittagsmusik im Predigerchor" for the Predigerkirche pipe organ concert series recordings.

== Cultural Heritage ==
The Predigerkirche church building and adjoining abbey−choir building are listed in the Swiss inventory of cultural property of national and regional significance as a Class A properties of national significance.

== Literature ==
- Dölf Wild, Urs Jäggin, Felix Wyss: Die Zürcher Predigerkirche – Wichtige Etappen der Baugeschichte. Auf dem Murerplan beschönigt? – Untersuchungen an der Westfassade der Predigerkirche. Amt für Städtebau der Stadt Zürich, Zürich 2006.
- Walter Baumann: Zürichs Kirchen, Klöster und Kapellen bis zur Reformation. Verlag Neue Zürcher Zeitung (NZZ), Zürich 1994, ISBN 978-3-8582-3508-4.
- Martina Wehrli-Johns: Geschichte des Zürcher Predigerkonvents (1230–1524). Mendikantentum zwischen Kirche, Adel und Stadt. Hans Rohr, Zürich 1980, ISBN 978-3-8586-5061-0.
