= Predigerkloster =

Monastery in Zurich, Switzerland

Coordinates: 47.3738°N 8.5454°E

The Predigerkloster was a monastery of the Dominican Order, established around 1234 and abolished in 1524, in the imperial city of Zurich, Switzerland. Its church, the Predigerkirche, is one of the four main churches in Zurich and was first built in 1231 as a Romanesque church of the then Dominican monastery. In the first half of the 14th century it was converted, the choir rebuilt between 1308 and 1350.

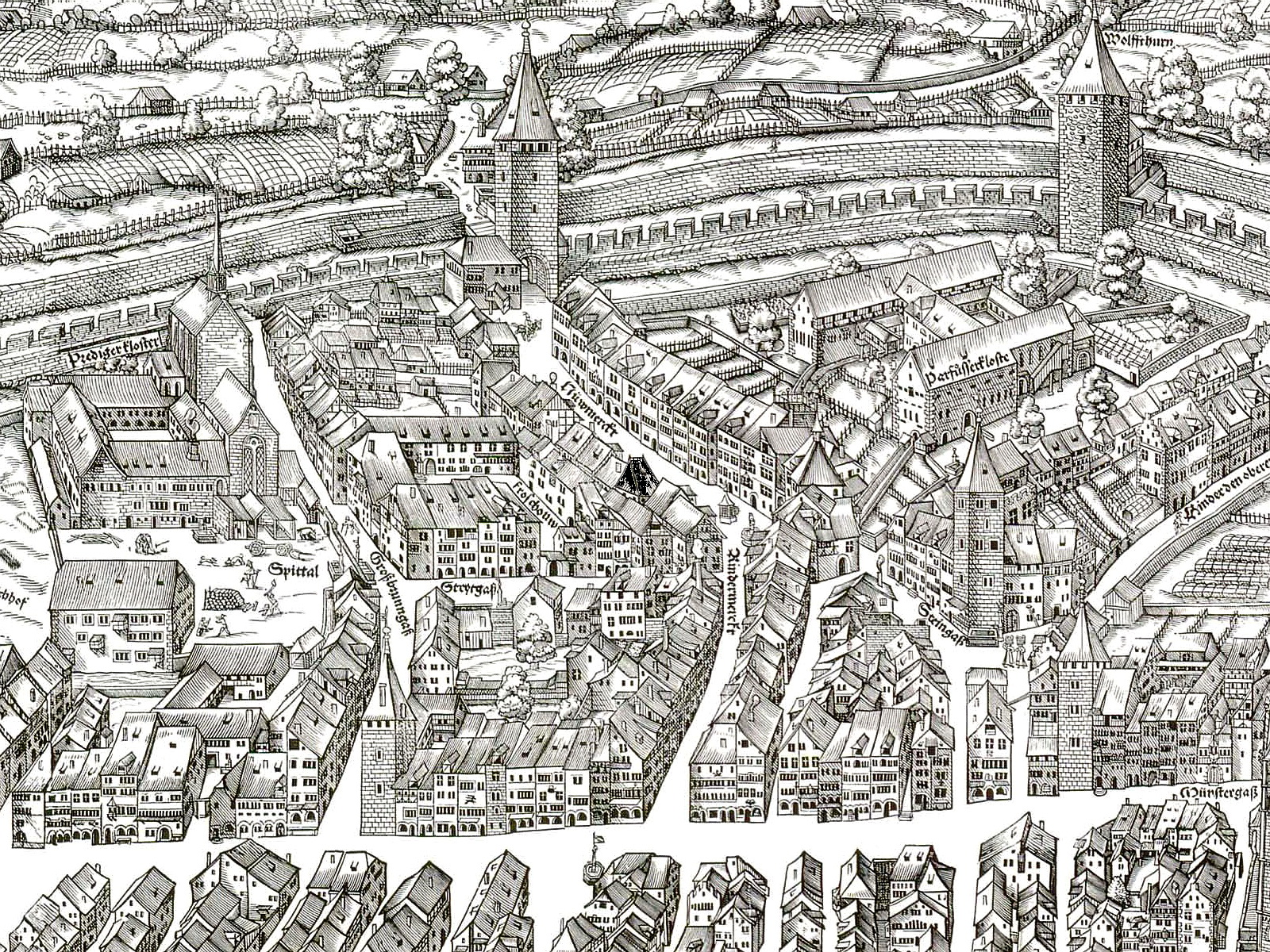
Neumarkt on the so-called Murerplan of 1576, Predigerkirche respectively the monastery to the left, the so-called Grimmenturm to the right.

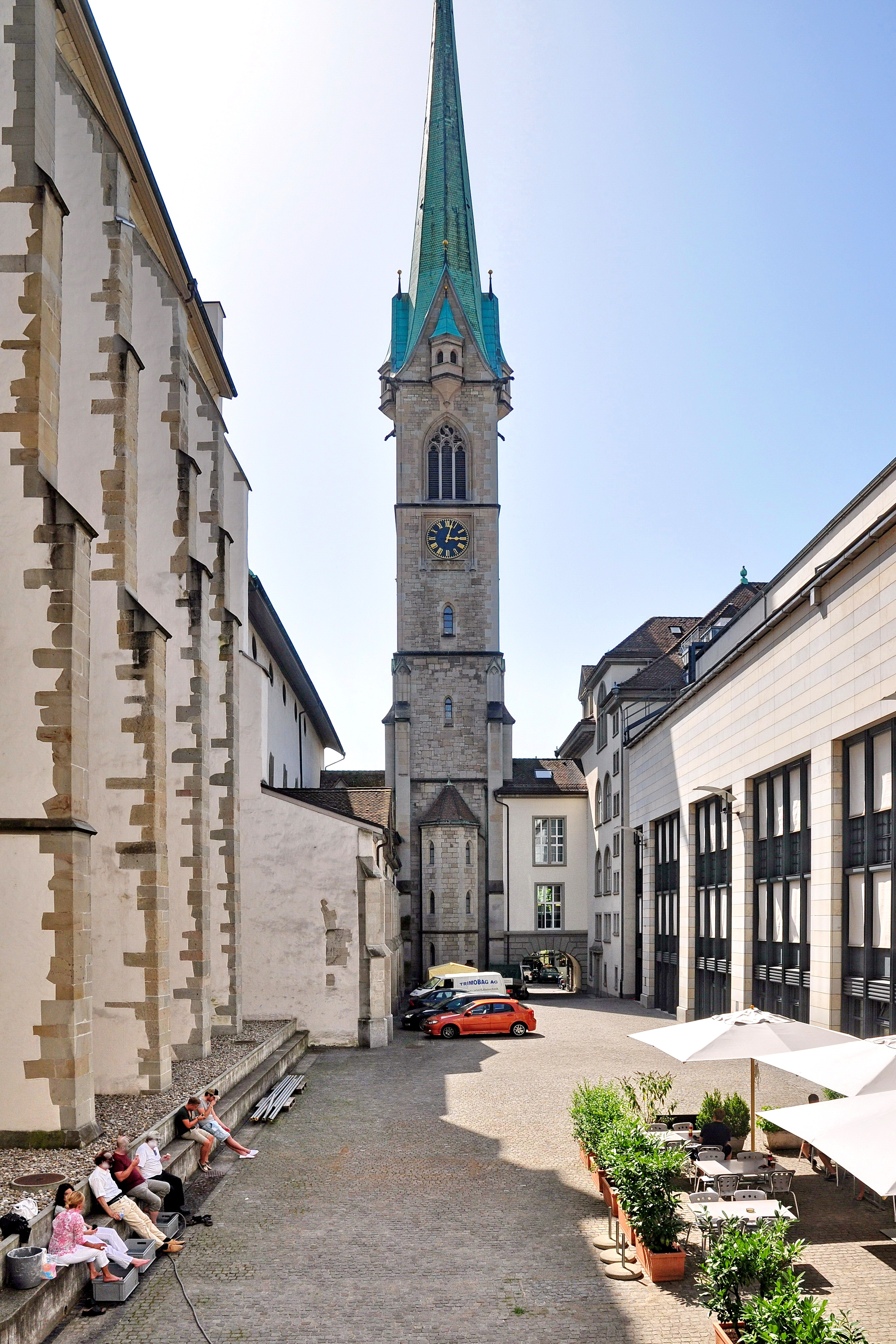
Predigerkirche to the left, the adjoint Zentralbibliothek to the right, the 96 metres (315 ft) high church tower in the middle nearby the location of the former cloister

== History ==
=== Early years ===
At that time, the city of Zurich supported the popular mendicant orders by assigning them free plots in the suburbs and asking them to support the city wall construction. The city's fortification was built in the east of the area in the late 11th or 12th century. The first Dominican friars settled, according to the chronicler Heinrich Brennwald, outside of the city walls of medieval Zurich at Stadelhofen in 1230 AD, and in 1231 it was first mentioned that in Zurich was a new monastery under construction. In the Schweizerchronik of 1513, Heinrich Brennwald calls for the Dominicans' arrival in Zurich in the year 1230. In two documents from 1231 a Dominican oratorio is mentioned. In 1232 a sale of land to Hugo von Ripelin, then the paddock prior, is mentioned. Initially, against the resistance of the Grossmünster canons, the Dominicans' inclusion in Zurich was granted in 1233/1235, "because they tirelessly drove the little foxes in the vineyard of the Lord".

Located at the medieval Neumarkt quarter, the commonly named Predigerkloster was first mentioned in 1234 AD as a monastery of the Dominican Order. The monastery consisted of a Romanesque church in the same place as today's Predigerkirche and the three-winged building complex attached to the north of the church. In 1254, a cemetery at the Predigerkloster was approved by Pope Honorius III. The monastery was built at the edge of the city on a flat terrace between the now subterranean Wolfbach stream and today's Hirschengraben street. The monastery area was delimited by a wall from the urban environment. Remnants of this wall were found in 1995 on the present Predigerplatz square. The hospital was erected in the west, beyond the Wolfbach stream at today's Spitalgasse, before the Dominicans settled in Zurich. In the decades in which the monastery was built, the new fortifications, depicted on the Murerplan of 1576, were built at that location. The Neumarkt quarter arose simultaneously and was settled increasingly by Beguines. Among other things, the orthogonal structure of the monastery, the town fortifications, and the Chorgasse and Predigergasse lanes are evident, and especially the latter is essential for this quarter; it leads from Neumarkt in a straight line to the southern portal, which was the main entrance to the church. The northern part of the monastery was predominantly used for agricultural purposes.

=== Influence ===
The order purchased 28 houses in the 13th and early 14th century. It was closely connected to the nobility and landed gentry in Zurich and the surrounding areas. Among them the Bilgeri family (Grimmenturm) and the House of Rapperswil, where they were received after their expulsion to 1348 to asylum in Rapperswil. Memorial measurement had to be held until the 14th century at Grossmünster because, thus, the most income was achieved. Until the Reformation in Zurich, all income obtained with the funerals had also to be delivered to the Grossmünster abbey.

Because of its location in the province of the order Teutonia, the monastery influenced most of German-speaking Switzerland. It was in charge of the pastoral care of the Oetenbach and Winterthur-Töss nunneries as well as the urban communities of the female Beguines, who lived nearby the Dominican and Franciscan mendicants in separate quarters outside the monasteries. After the founding of the Dominican monasteries in Bern, Chur, and Zofingen, the counties of Baden and Uznach, the cantons Obwalden, Nidwalden, Zug, and Zurich, as well as parts of Glarus, Uri and Gaster, and the border areas around Schwarzwald and Klettgau remained under the pastoral care of the Zurich Dominicans. In 1259 Count Rudolf IV von Rapperswil, Countess Elisabeth's father, donated specific duties and lands "in den Widen" for the construction of the Dominikanerinnenkloster Maria Zuflucht. Initially, the Dominican nuns were supported by the Dominican monastery in Zurich because of its close relationship to the House of Rapperswil. After the founding of the monastery, the Dominican friars in Chur took over the pastoral assistance of the monastic community in Weesen.

=== Decline ===
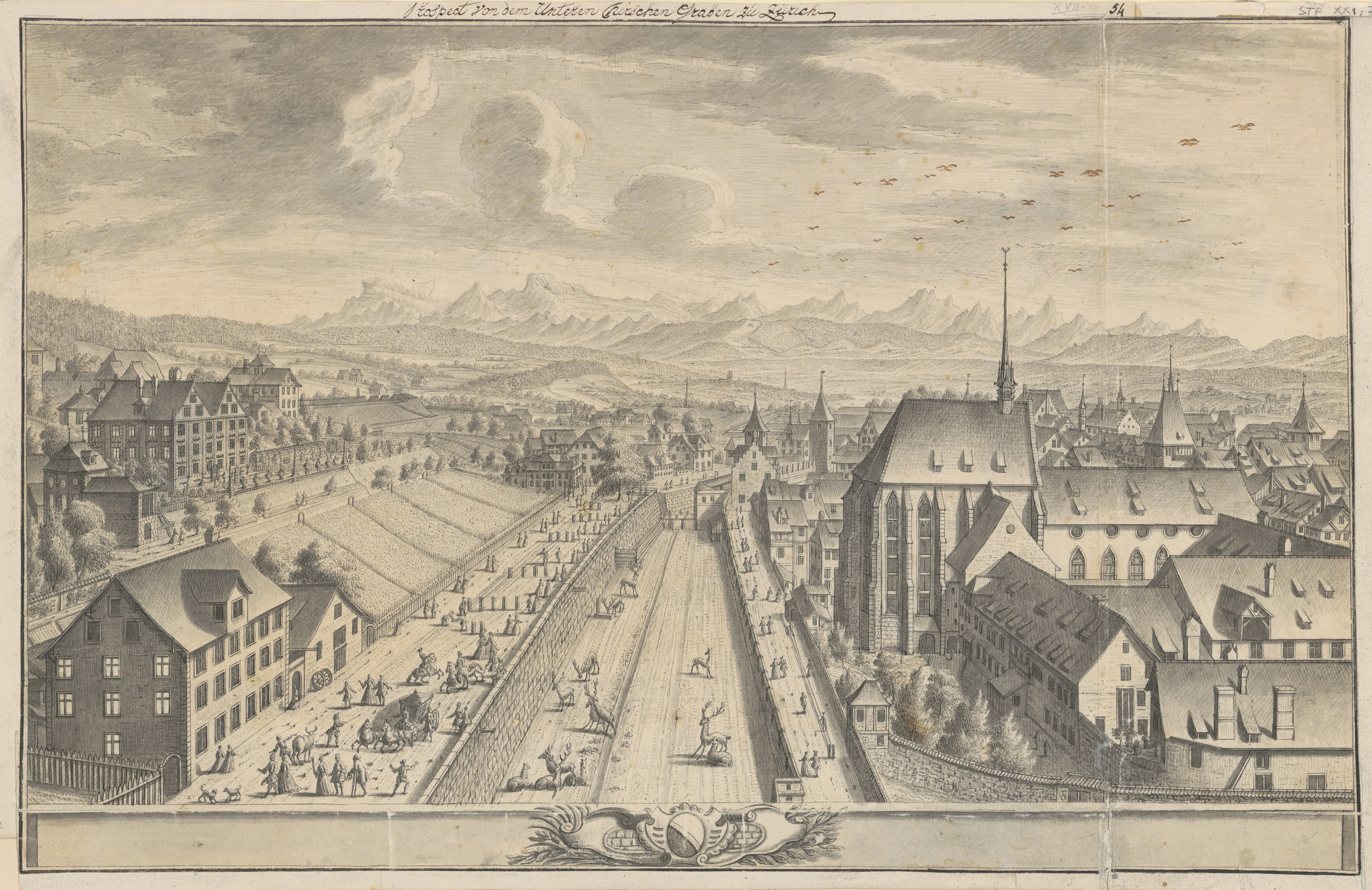
The monastery's buildings and the town's fortification at Seilergraben–Hirschengraben around 1750

The highly ambitious dimensions of the Dominican Baroque church were designed in the early 14th century. But in the 1330s, the construction was already set, and it had remained unfinished for years. The second building phase ended in a much more harmonious construction, and much of the Romanesque building's substance was saved; for example, almost the entire Romanesque transept remained. Historical events explain that change. The revolution of 1336 that Rudolf Brun and his entourage brought to power was followed by a period of economic uncertainty reaching its peak with the plague of 1348/49, the persecution and killing of the Jewish citizens of the so-called Synagogengasse in 1349, as well as the "Zurich night of murder" (Mordnacht) by 1350, a failed counter coup of Brun's opposition under the son of Johann I (Habsburg-Laufenburg), Johann II. Unlike the Franciscan and the Augustinian orders, the Preachers in Zurich pleaded to the Pope, another opponent of the political situation in Zurich, and therefore the monastery was forced to leave the city for several years. Its exile led to Winterthur and Kaiserstuhl and finally to Rapperswil, whose counts were the most prominent opponents of Brun's regime. This development represents the beginning of the general decline of the Zurich Dominican monastery.

Within the city, as the other "mendicant" orders, the Predigern have been reduced to the function of area pastors. The monastery was disestablished on 3 December 1524, worship in the church was discontinued, and the buildings and income of the monastery were assigned to the adjoining Heilig-Geist-Spital.

== Buildings of the monastery ==
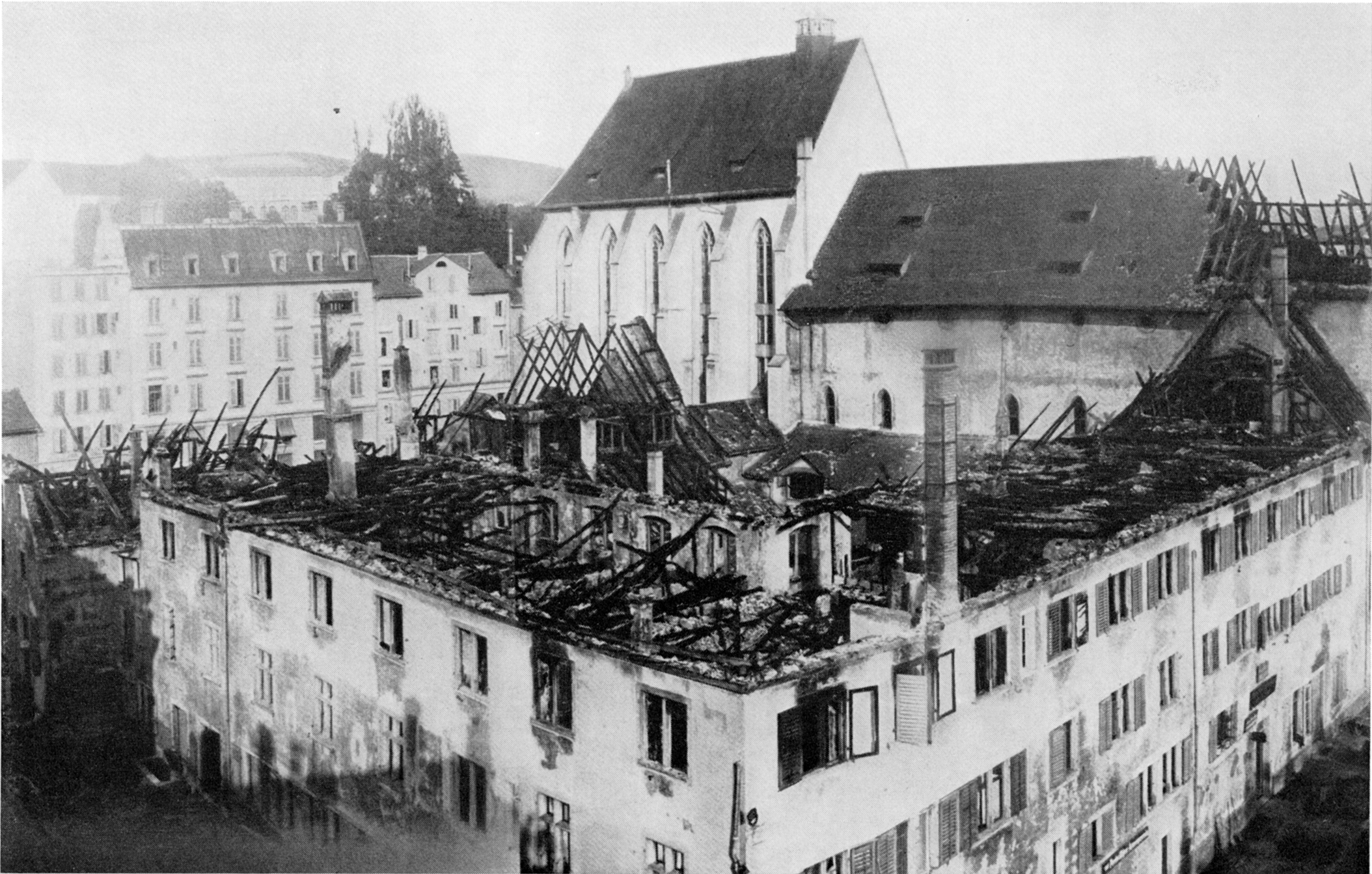
The burned-out ruins of the monastery, and the damaged roof of the nave of the Prediger church in mid-1877.

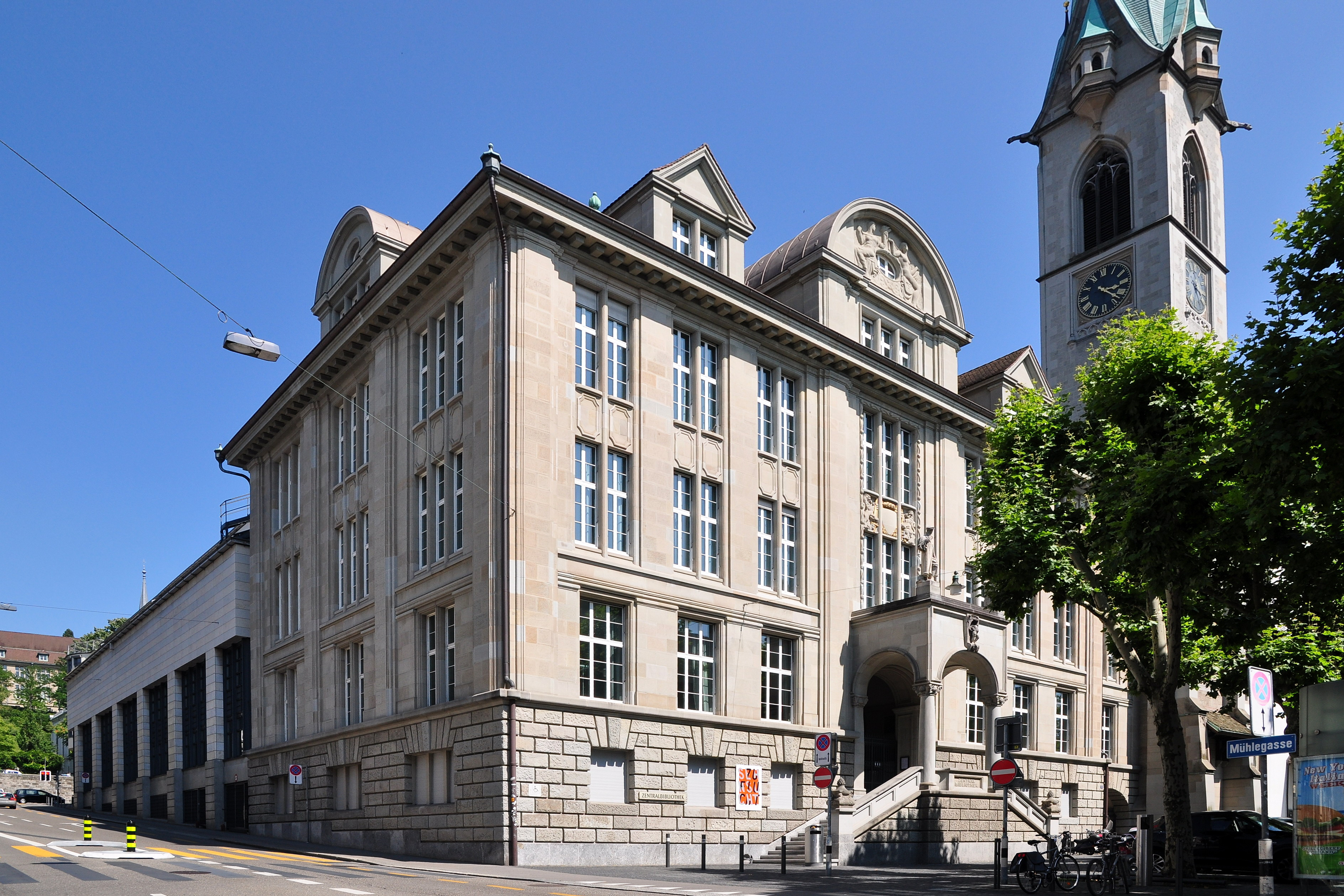
Quite the same view as before: Zentralbibliothek at the location of the former monastery buildings in 2011.

The former monastery buildings were used, with the monastery buildings becoming a hospital. After the construction of the new hospital in 1842, they became the so-called "Versorgungsanstalt" where chronically ill, old, incurable mental patients were housed; the contemporaries complained until in 1870 when the Burghölzli sanatory was built. The monastery buildings were sold in 1873 to the city of Zurich, which used it to house destitute citizens. But the old monastery building burned down on 25 June 1887, its ruins were dismantled in the same year, and the open space was used for celebrations.

On 28 June 1914, the citizens of Zurich agreed to the establishment of the Central Library (German: Zentralbibliothek), that was completed according to the plans by Hermann Fietz in 1917. So the cantonal library was outsourced, but in 1919 moved back, and again moved to make room for today's Staatsarchiv Zürich; therefore since 1982, the premise is used for the library, in particular for the so-called Musikabteilung.

== See also ==
- Predigerkirche Zürich

== Literature ==
- Dölf Wild, Urs Jäggin, Felix Wyss: Die Zürcher Predigerkirche – Wichtige Etappen der Baugeschichte. Auf dem Murerplan beschönigt? – Untersuchungen an der Westfassade der Predigerkirche. Amt für Städtebau der Stadt Zürich, Zurich 2006.
- Dölf Wild: Stadtmauern. Ein neues Bild der Stadtbefestigungen Zürichs (= Stadtgeschichte und Städtebau in Zürich. Schriften zu Archäologie, Denkmalpflege und Stadtplanung. 5). Schrift zur Ausstellung im Haus zum Haus zum Rech, Zürich, 6. Februar bis 30. April 2004. Amt für Städtebau, Baugeschichtliches Archiv, Zurich 2004, ISBN 3-905384-05-1.
- Dölf Wild: Das Predigerkloster in Zürich. Ein Beitrag zur Architektur der Bettelorden im 13. Jahrhundert. Monographien der Kantonsarchäologie Zürich 32, Hochbaudepartement der Stadt Zürich, Amt für Städtebau, Archäologie, Zurich 1999, ISBN 978-3-905647-89-1.
- Walter Baumann: Zürichs Kirchen, Klöster und Kapellen bis zur Reformation. Verlag Neue Zürcher Zeitung (NZZ), Zurich 1994, ISBN 978-3-8582-3508-4.
- Martina Wehrli-Johns: Geschichte des Zürcher Predigerkonvents (1230–1524). Mendikantentum zwischen Kirche, Adel und Stadt. Hans Rohr, Zurich 1980, ISBN 978-3-8586-5061-0.
