= Synagoge Zürich Löwenstrasse =

Orthodox synagoge in Zürich, Switzerland

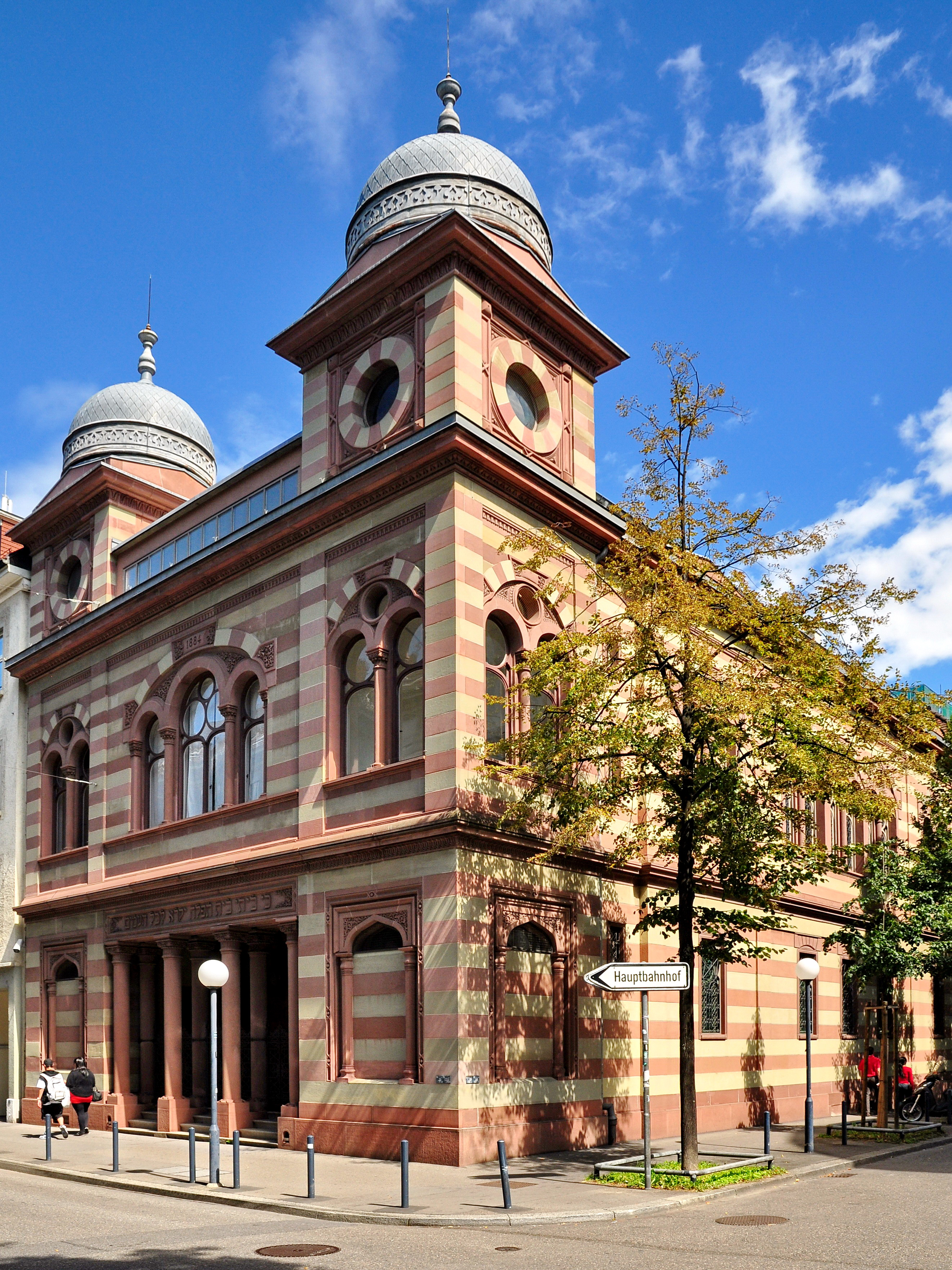
- The synagogue as seen from Löwenstrasse in 2011

- Location of the synagogue in the Canton of Zürich

Religion
- Affiliation: Orthodox Judaism
- Rite: Nusach Ashkenaz
- Ecclesiastical or organizational status: Synagogue
- Ownership: Israelitische Cultusgemeinde Zürich (ICZ)
- Status: Active

Location
- Location: Löwenstrasse 10, Zürich, Canton of Zürich
- Country: Switzerland
- Interactive map of Synagoge Zürich Löwenstrasse
- Coordinates: 47°22′22.51″N 8°32′5.15″E

Architecture
- Architects: 1884: Alfred Chiodera; Theophil Tschudy; 1993: Bernard San; Michael Berlowitz; Ron Epstein-Mil
- Type: Synagogue architecture
- Style: Moorish Revival; Byzantine Revival
- Established: 1862 (as ICZ congregation)
- Groundbreaking: 1883
- Completed: 1884 (original); 1936, 1952, and 1993 (renovations)
- Construction cost: CHF 200,000

Specifications
- Direction of façade: West
- Capacity: c. 350 worshipers
- Materials: Brick

Website
- icz.org (in German)

Swiss Cultural Property of National Significance
- Official name: Synagogue
- Designated: 2015

The Synagoge Zürich Löwenstrasse is an Orthodox Jewish synagogue, located at Löwenstrasse 10, Zürich, in the Canton of Zürich, Switzerland. Built in 1884 in the Moorish Revival and Byzantine Revival styles, the building is the oldest and largest synagogue in Zürich. The building also houses the prayer and school house of Israelitische Cultusgemeinde Zürich (ICZ) which was founded in 1862. ICZ is a unified Jewish community having about 2,500 members, and thus the largest Jewish community in Switzerland, which since 2007 is recognized as a denomination. In the synagogue, the community celebrates the daily Minyan and Shabbat and holiday services.

The building is a Cultural Property of National Significance.

== Location ==
The synagogue is located at Löwenstrasse 10, between Bahnhofstrasse and Schanzengrabens in the City district of Zürich, between Löwenplatz (Zürich Trams 3 and 14) and Sihlporte (Trams 2 and 9). The synagogue was built outside of the Baroque town wall those very last remains were broken in the 1900s, previously the Celtic-Roman Turicum, at the area being then called Aussersihl, meaning that it was outside of the medieval city at the former Sihl river delta.

== History ==
=== Medieval synagogue in Zürich ===
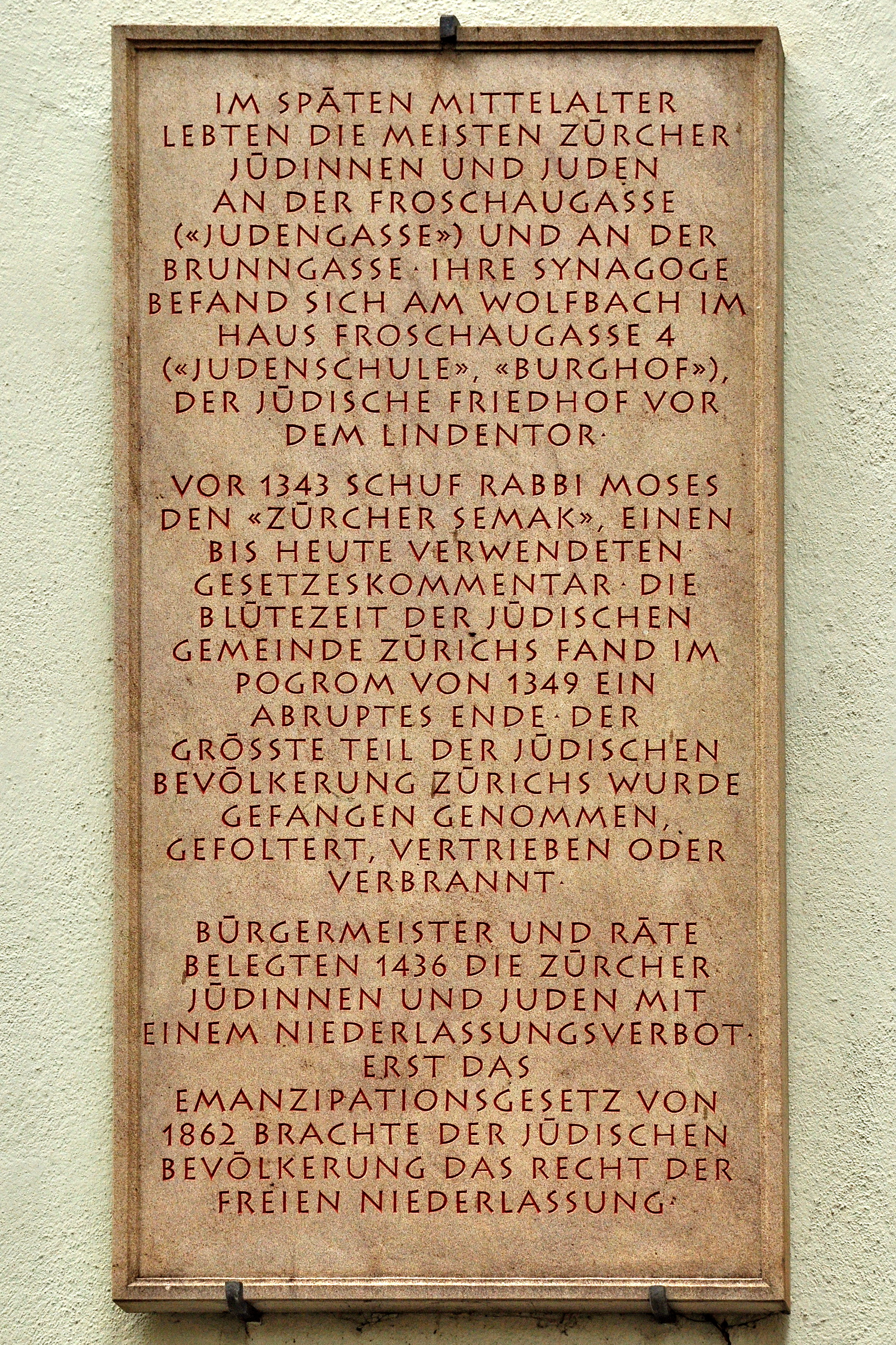
Synagogengasse, Neumarkt, Zürich

In 2002 the building Froschaugasse 4 in the historical Neumarkt quarter was the location of archeological excavations. The former building Zur Judenschule ("Jewish school") was named so to the 18th century because it housed the European High Middle Ages synagogue of Zürich. In 1363 it was called "Judenschuol" (a medieval term in Zürich for a Synagogue), and some remains of the interior structure date before 1423 respectively 1349, when the Jewish citizens had to leave Zürich, and the synagogue was repealed. Obscured by later layers of plaster, a small remnant of the adornment was found on occasion of the surveys, including fragments of a wall painting from the 14th century.

Jewish residents having "Husroeichi" (an old Swiss-German term meaning a house with a separate chimney) were allowed on 25 February 1352 to live in Zürich, and they were secured by the town law, but there were some restrictions and additions, namely related to testimony, and loans and pawnbroking. On 2 November 1383 the Jewish citizens of Zürich were allowed by Heinrich, Bishop of Konstanz, on request of the city council of Zürich to renew the Synagogue and the cemetery, under the reserve that exclusively Jews may be buried who resided (namely Burgrecht) in Zürich.

At the location of the former synagogue, a plaque was mounted towards Synagogengasse and Grimmenturm; the former Synagogue served as a storeroom, now a bookstore, and was never re-used as a synagogue. The medieval synagogue room was located on the ground floor of the rear component of the building Froschaugasse 4. By numerous alterations in the following centuries, however, much of the medieval building stock disappeared. The east facade was rebuilt, the ground was laid at a deeper level, and doors and windows got their present shape in the 20th century. Only a small remnant of the late medieval room ornaments are preserved, namely the wall painting fragments from the 14th century in the form of leaf tendrils in red and black color. The medieval building Froschaugasse 4 probably housed the synagogue in the 13th century, and as documented before the persecution of the Jewish community in the years of the plague around 1349 AD.

=== Expulsion from the city's republic of Zürich (1423) ===
After the pogrom of 1349, the building Froschaugassee has not been used for some time (at least 1357–1368), and from 1370 to 1377 Christians lived in the house. Shortly before 1380, Jewish families lived again in the building, and the building was used for worship. The surviving Jewish citizens of the 1349 pogrom, were expelled indefinitely from the city in 1423. Thereafter, the property probably was used from 1455 as an accommodation building, and the Jewish citizens were forbidden to live in the city and in the canton Zürich to 1850, even in the whole area of the today's Switzerland; excluded the two communities in Endingen and Lengnau in the Surb Valley.

=== Establishment of a new community in Zürich (1850) ===
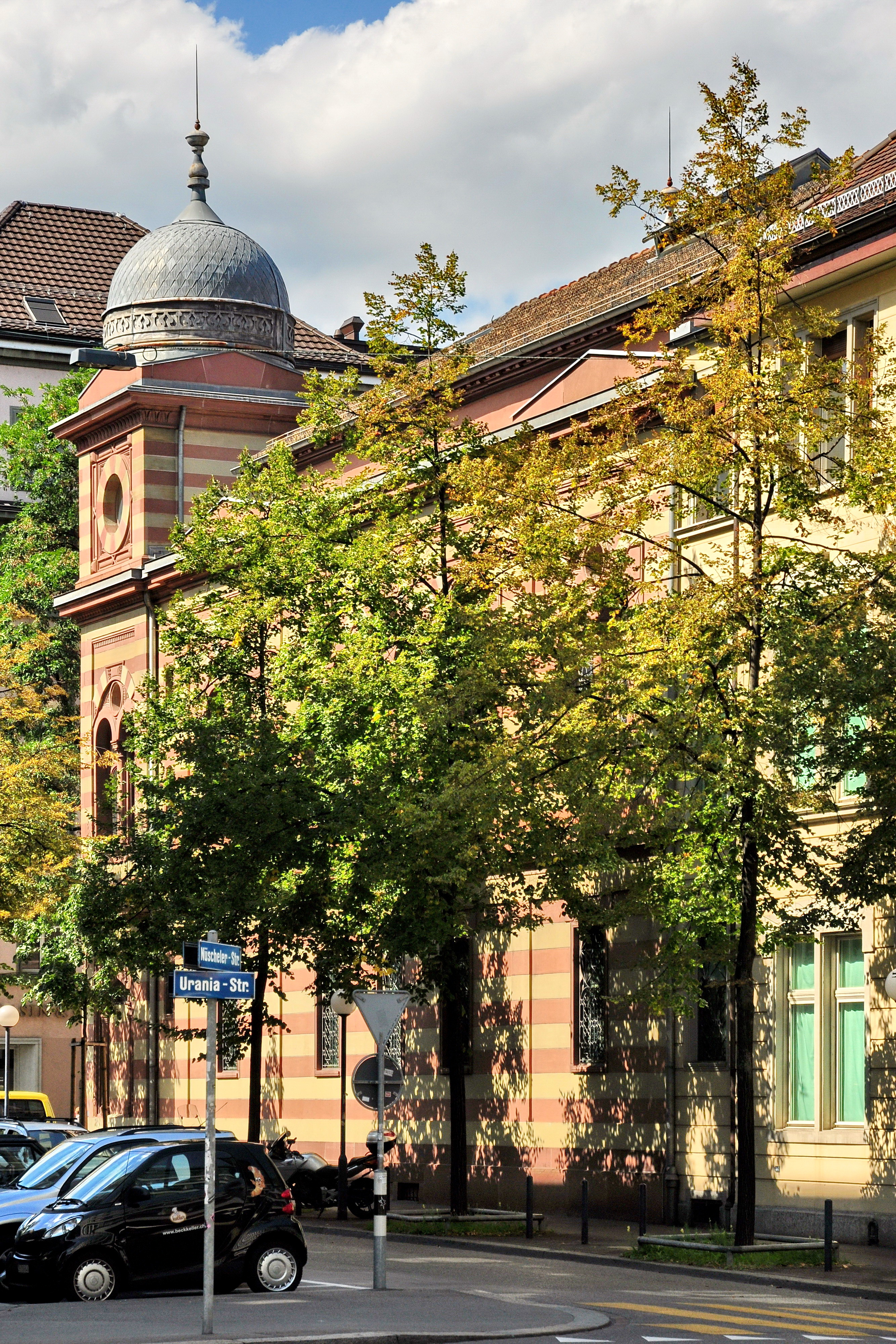
as seen from Uraniastrasse

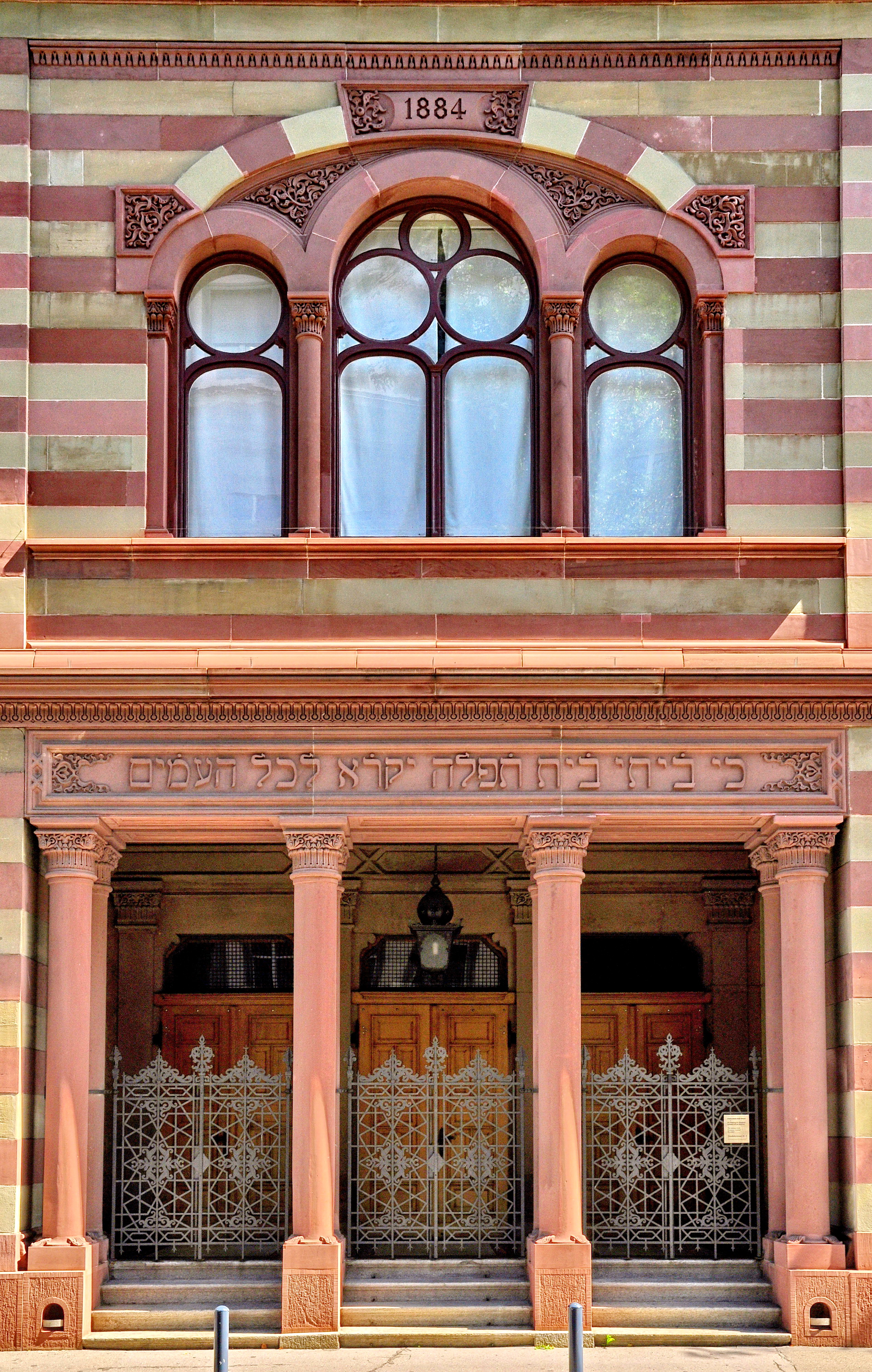

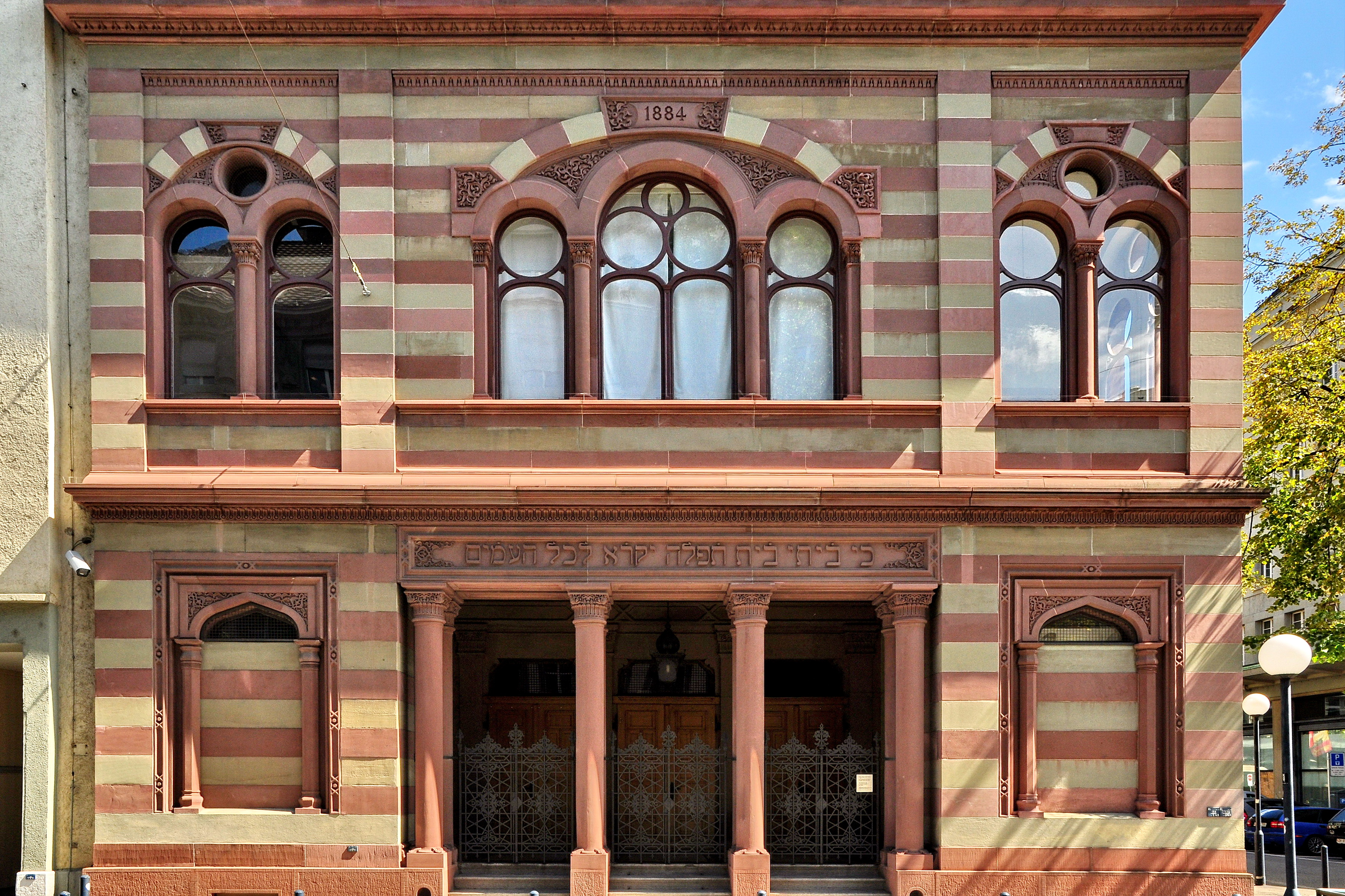

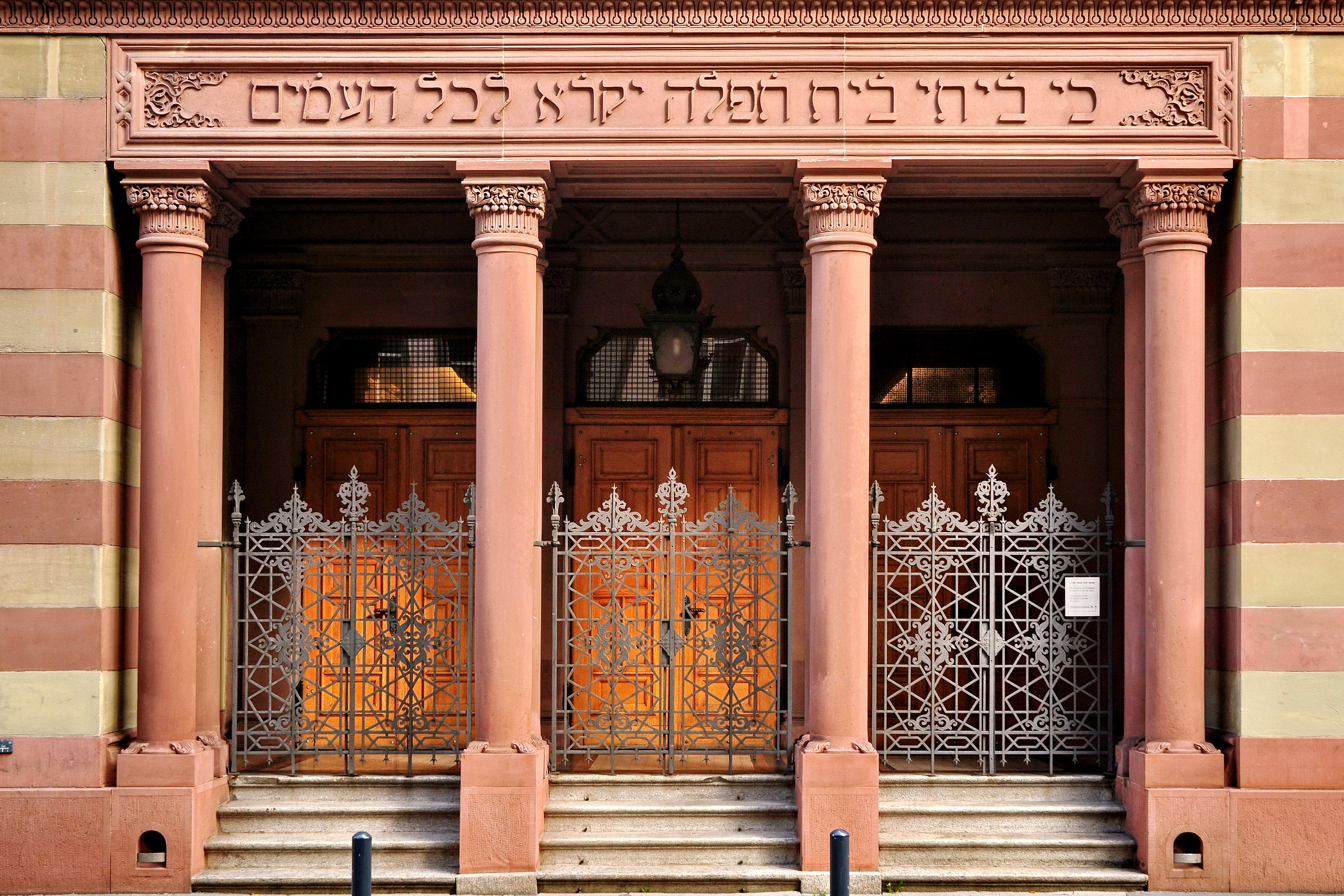

Among others, Jewish citizens from Endingen and Lengnau, 80 Jewish women, children and men in all, were allowed by the authorities to settle in the whole territory of the Canton of Zurich in 1850, and in 1862 only 175 people, including 100 in the Zürich district.

After the repeal of the majority of the legal restrictions on Jewish citizens on 3 March 1862, on 29 March 1862 the Israelitischer Kultusverein (Jewish society) was founded by 12 members in Zürich, and in 1880 its name was changed in the present Israelitische Cultusgemeinde. The first Jewish community in the city of Zürich within the past 438 years, exceptionally appreciated the support by the city authorities: As still lacked a suitable location for a Synagogue, "the most liberal city council provided the community an excellent nice place for a synagogue..." As the congregation did not have so much money to set up a temple and to get it into good condition, "...these noble fathers of the city even granted a loan of CHF 3,000 which is to be repaid in installments over five years. To a restoration of the Lord, kosher dining in a foreign land is allowed. Unpleasantly the fact that was often agitated here by a certain party against the commercial treaty with France, because in the same by the French [government] refusal's to otherwise not to sign the contract [comment: related to a trade relationship with the Swiss Federal authorities], when the emancipation of the Jews in Switzerland not was pronounced, the more the generous method of the Zürich city council is to recognize." In 1870 the Jewish community was increased to 37 families, and had increased again to 500 in 1912. In 1895 a religious turmoil occurred in the Zürich community, and thus the Orthodox members wished to establish a separate temple. As early as in August 1877, the community tried to be accepted as a religious community in the canton of Zürich – the request was denied as "otherwise, other sects might apply for a state contribution." Not as before 2007, the ICZ community got the cantonal acceptance by introducing the accordingly cantonal law on 1 January 2008.

== Predecessor buildings of the present synagogue ==
A first prayer hall was established in autumn 1864 at an "excellent and beautiful place" in the medieval Jewish residential area Brunngasse at Neumarkt, Zürich; 320 Swiss francs (CHF) had to be paid annually to rent the room. For the equipment of the Betsaal (prayer room), the community received a loan, from the city, of CHF 3,000, repayable within five years. Due to the rapidly increasing number of members of the congregation, in 1867 a new prayer hall had to be established in the old Zürich granary at the Münsterbrücke Limmat crossing at Münsterhof, opposite of Limmatquai situated at the Fraumünster cathedral in the medieval core of Zürich. A rent of CHF 1,000 a year had to be paid, and in the prayer room for 8 women and 24 men a women's gallery also was established. On 26 February 1879 the community decided to build a synagogue, as the lease contract for the prayer hall in the old granary was terminated. In August 1880 the community set up the now third prayer hall in the old theater foyer, the present Obergericht building, and they moved again temporarily the community's prayer room in the building Brunngasse 15.

== Inauguration of the synagogue on 16 September 1884 ==
In his sermon Rabbi Dr. Hermann Engelbert mentioned at the end of his speech that "it would one day come a time when all people united by faith and love for a covenant of humanity itself, where the kingdom of truth, of light and peace will be carried out. The Israelite worship is determined to contribute to this end goals his part." In the evening a banquet was held of approximately 270 people invited to the event, followed by a ball, under participation of officials of the government and Christian clergy of Zürich.

== Architecture ==
The construction of the current synagogue was realized in 1883/84 on a plot at Löwenstrasse. The foundation stone was laid on 6 July 1883, and the inauguration took place on 16 September 1884. The construction was carried out on the plans of the architects Chiodera and Tschudy, who designed a synagogue in the Moorish Revival and Byzantine Revival styles. The construction including land cost over then 200,000 Swiss Francs. The building of the synagogue was highly praised because of its acoustically good properties. The Moorish style imaginative inner decorations were not appreciated by all members of the 1880s community, but "thanks to the subdued lighting, the wealth colored jewelry was less exciting and distracting as expected."

The synagogue was originally set up for 200 men and 170 women seating capacity. Six years after the inauguration of the synagogue, the construction had to be converted for reasons of space, and so in 1890 additional seats were set up on the women's gallery.

At the day of the inauguration, a harmonium was battled by the Orthodox members of the community, but it was removed. "The Board plans, without seeking approval from the community, to install s Harmonium in the synagogue, and indeed by the introduction of the same, the law-abiding fellow believers would not be ablel to perform their devotions in a synagogue provided with a harmonium." In the following years, there has been repeatedly tensions between the secular and orthodox members, leading to cleavage of the Zürich community.

In 1897 a separate prayer room for the Orthodox members was created, next to the synagogue school building of the Jewish community. Since 1899 the construction of a larger synagogue was discussed, indeed the plans never were realized, but a community meeting discussed again in 1907: A new synagogue for the whole community having space for 800 to 1,000 seat places that replaced the synagogue, or a second synagogue – the construction of the Orthodox synagogue at Freigutstrasse was executed in 1898, and so the Israelitische Religionsgesellschaft was established. On 15 September 1905 occurred the donation of a Torah scroll by Solomon Guggenheimer-Wyler, namely a Sefer Torah. Since it was the second donation of a Sefer Torah, it was noted that the "old Jewish sense is not yet died out."

The synagogue Löwenstrasse was renovated in 1936, 1952, and most recently in 1993, executed by the architects Bernard San, Michael Berlowitz and Ron Epstein, to grant restoration and renovation maintenance works.

== Synagogenchor Zürich ==
The Synagogenchor Zürich today is composed of two dozen singers. Once a month, in the worship on the Sabbath morning and on occasion of the High Holi Days celebrations, as well as on interfaith events and concerts in Switzerland and abroad, the choir is active for over 100 years. Its members still practice and have a wide variety of religious orientations, in the cultural and religious context of the unified community ICZ, which maintains an open attitude and connecting to the internal Jewish discussion. The repertoire of the choir comprises about 60 mostly synagogue songs and accompaniments of Chasan-German, French, Polish and Russian composers of the 19th century and contemporary Swiss, American and Israeli musicians.

== Israelitische Cultusgemeinde Zürich (ICZ) ==
After the repeal of the majority legal restrictions on Jewish citizens, on 29 March 1862 Israelitische Kultusverein being the Jewish society was founded by 12 members, and in 1880 its name was changed in the present Israelitische Cultusgemeinde Zürich. As of today, the unified Jewish community of Zürich comprises about 2,500 members, being the largest Jewish community in Switzerland. Sigi Feigel and Daniel Jositsch are among the most prominent contemporary members of the community. It also provides a community center, a school, the Jewish cemetery, and a library of national importance. In 2009, the library that was founded in 1939, was awarded because of their special content as a Swiss heritage of national importance. Nevertheless, there were discussions in early 2014 about the future of this cultural heritage for financial reasons. The library of the largest Jewish community in Switzerland owns 50,000 volumes in Yiddish, Hebrew and German language. Among these are in addition to fiction valuable scientific work. The religious school was attended by 80 children in 1884, in 1894 there were 130 students, and 18 years later 230. Since 1898, the municipality has its own schoolhouse. The poor relief is governed since 1901.

== Cemeteries ==
On 5 July 1865 the Jewish community, which at that time numbered nearly 30 members, mentioned the acquisition of a field for applying a cemetery. The cemeteries Unter Friesenberg and Oberer Friesenberg were established in 1865 and 1952.

== Cultural heritage ==
The building of the Synagogue is listed in the Swiss inventory of cultural property of national and regional significance as a Class B object of regional importance, the library of the Israelitische Cultusmeinde Zürich (ICZ) in Enge at the Arboretum Zürich even as a Class A object of national importance.

== See also ==
- History of the Jews in Switzerland
- List of synagogues in Switzerland
- List of cultural property of national significance in Switzerland: Zurich
