= Feig =

Feig is a German Jewish surname. Notable people with the surname include:

- Erik Feig, American film executive and producer
- Georg Feig (1899–1970), German Army officer
- Herbert C. Feig (1886-1975), American businessman and politician
- Paul S. Feig (born 1962), American film director, actor and author
- Sigalit Feig, Israeli-German dancer
- Elmer Feig (1897-1968), An American unlicensed architect

== See also ==
- Feigel
- Feigl
