= Israelitische Cultusgemeinde Zürich =

Jewish community in Zürich, Switzerland

Israelitische Cultusgemeinde Zürich (ICZ)
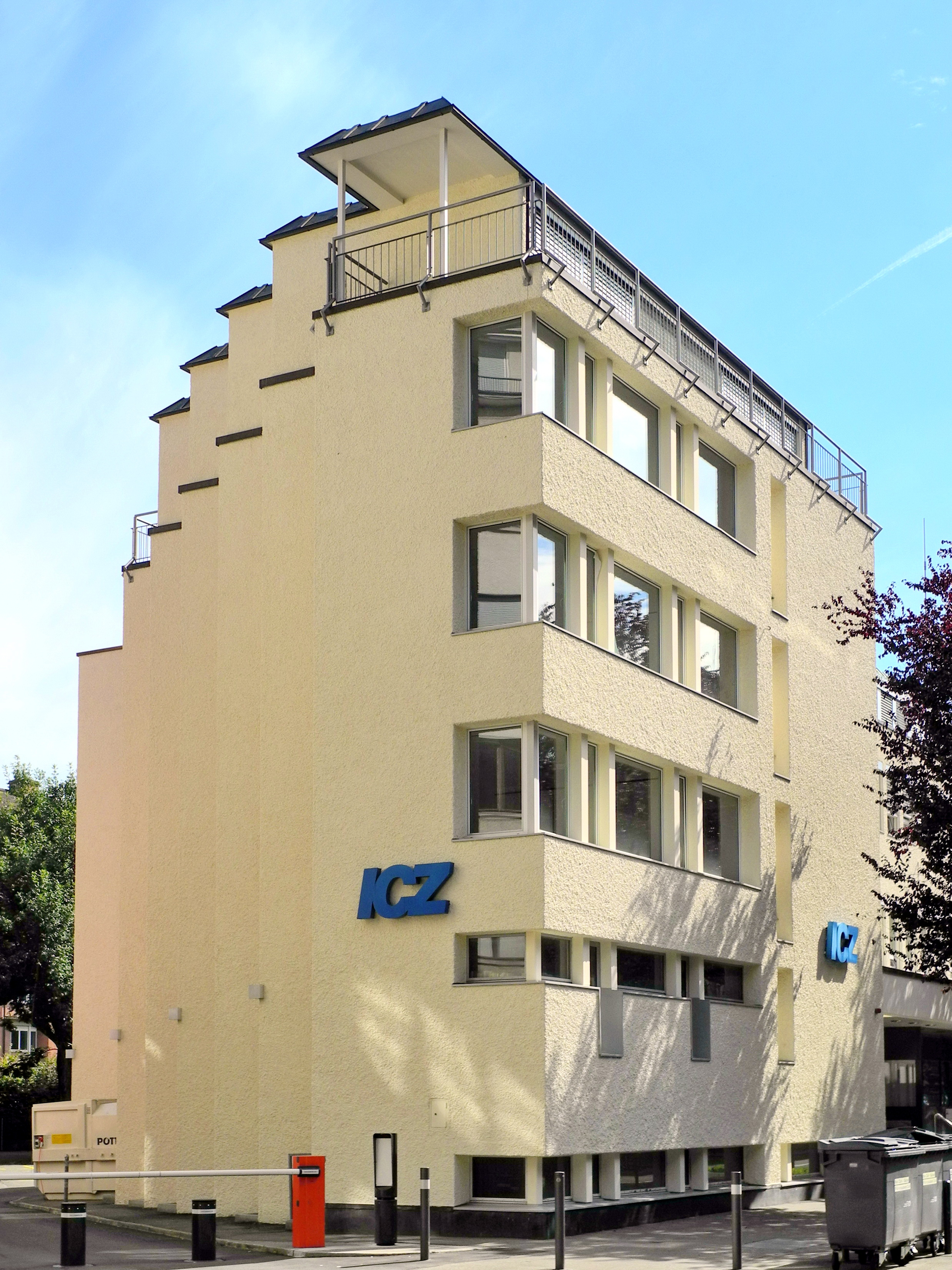
- ICZ building and library in Zürich-Enge, in 2012

Total population
- about 2,500

Regions with significant populations
- City of Zürich, Canton of Zürich, Switzerland

Religions
- Orthodox Judaism

Languages
- Swiss German, Yiddish, Hebrew

Israelitische Cultusgemeinde Zürich (Jewish Community of Zürich), commonly shortened to ICZ, is a united Orthodox Jewish community, located in the city of Zürich, in the canton of Zürich, Switzerland. Consisting of approximately 2,500 members, the ICZ is the largest Jewish community in Switzerland. The community worships at Synagoge Zürich Löwenstrasse in Zürich-City, operates a community center with a kindergarten and Jewish library in Zürich-Enge, and is responsible for two cemeteries (Unterer and Oberer Friesenberg).

== History ==
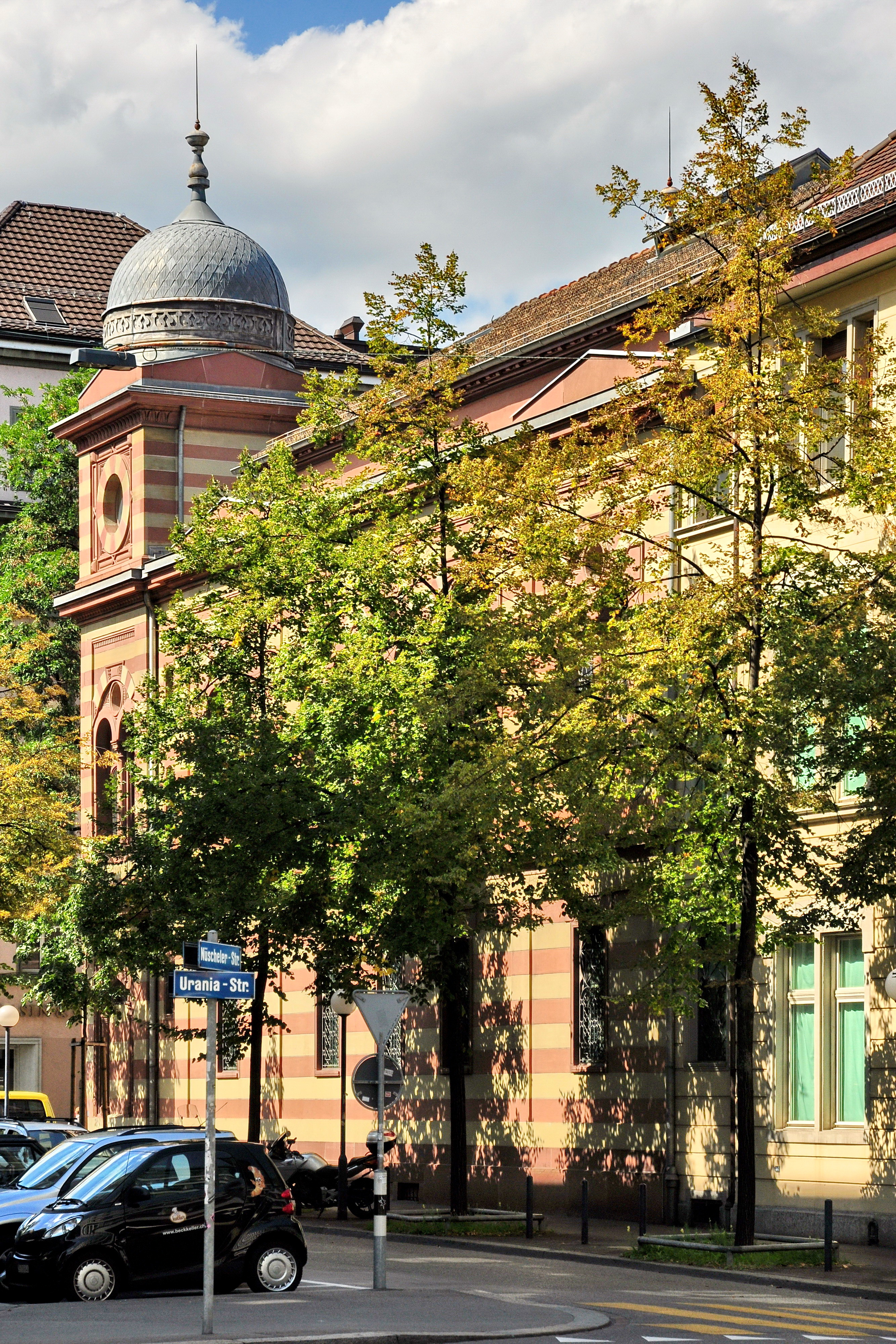
Synagoge Zürich Löwenstrasse

A Jewish community in Zürich was first mentioned in 1273, but during the 1349 pogrom the Jewish citizens were banned from Zürich, and the synagogue was abandoned. On 25 February 1352, Jewish citizens were allowed to live within the medieval town walls again. In 1363, the so-called "Judenschuol", a medieval term in Zürich for the synagogue situated at the Neumarkt was mentioned. On 2 November 1383, the Jewish citizens of Zürich were allowed by Heinrich, Bishop of Konstanz, on request of the city council of Zürich, to renew the synagogue and the cemetery, on condition that only Jews who resided (i.e. had Burgrecht) in Zürich could be buried there. At the location of the former synagogue, a plaque was mounted towards Synagogengasse and Grimmenturm.

The Jewish citizens who survived the 1349 pogrom were finally expelled from the city in 1423. The synagogue building was probably used from 1455 onwards as a residential property, and Jews were forbidden to live in the city and canton of Zürich, and indeed throughout Switzerland, until 1850, with the exception of in two communities: Endingen and Lengnau in the Surb Valley. In 1850, Jews from Endingen and Lengnau, some 80 men, women, and children, were permitted by the authorities to settle anywhere in the canton of Zurich. In 1862, there were only 175 people, including 100 in the Zürich district. After the repeal of most legal restrictions on Jewish citizens on 29 March 1862, the Israelitische Kultusverein (literally: Israelite Cult Society) was founded by 12 members. In 1880, its name was changed in the present Israelitische Cultusgemeinde Zürich. In August 1877 the community tried to be accepted as a religious community in the canton of Zürich, however the request was denied as "otherwise, other sects might apply for a state contribution." In 2007 the ICZ community received cantonal recognition with the introduction of a cantonal law on 1 January 2008. As of today, the united Jewish community of Zürich is the largest Jewish community in Switzerland. Sigi Feigel, Mordechai Piron and Daniel Jositsch are among of the most prominent members of the community.

== Library ==
The library was recognized for its special contents as a "Swiss heritage of national importance" in 2009. Nevertheless, there were discussions in early 2014 about the future of this cultural heritage for financial reasons. The library of the largest Jewish community in Switzerland owns more than 50,000 volumes in Yiddish, Hebrew and German. These include, in addition to works of fiction, valuable scientific works, Judaica, Hebraica, Hebrew prints from the 16th to 18th centuries, theological literature (Talmudica), prayer books and bibles.

In December 1939, the Verein Jüdische Bibliothek Zürich (literally: Zürich Jewish Library Association) handed over its stock to establish the ICZ library, while Jewish libraries in Europe were being destroyed by the Nazi regime. After the war, Hannah Arendt, then managing director of the Jewish Cultural Reconstruction, Inc., handed over to the ICZ library part of the library of the Breslau Rabbinical Seminary in Germany, which was suppressed by the Nazis. The oldest books in this collection date back to the 16th century, among them a 1595 print of Flavius Josephus' Antiquities of the Jews, an example of early book printing dating back to 1595.

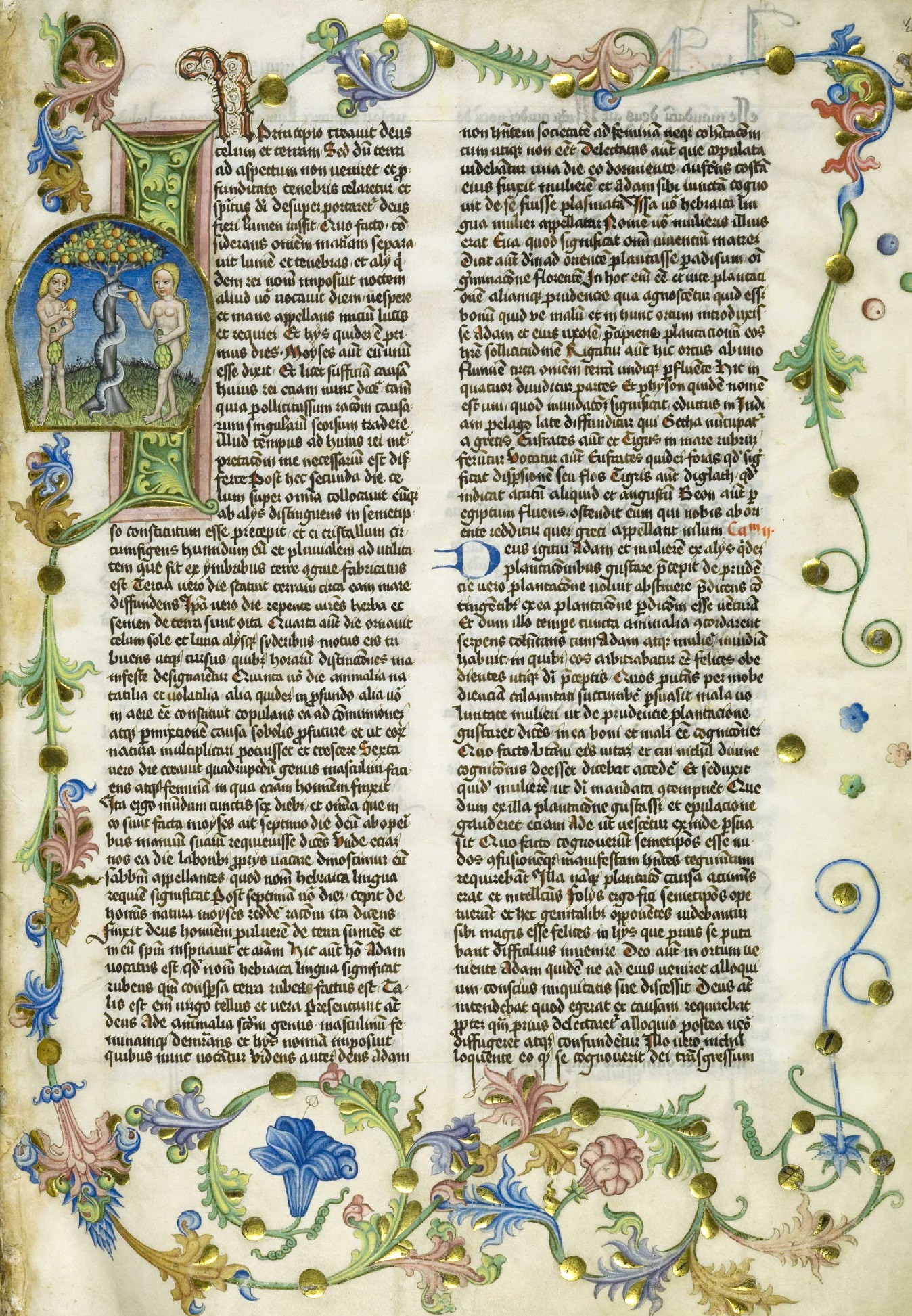
1466 manuscript of the Antiquitates Iudaice

On the occasion of the 75th anniversary of the ICZ library, an anniversary edition Quelle lebender Bücher (literally: Source of Living Books) was published, edited by the ICZ librarians Yvonne Domhardt and Kerstin A. Paul, in which 75 people presented their favorite book from the library. Among them are "Five Years in the Country of Neutralia" by the Ukrainian journalist Shemariah Gorelik, who talks about his stay in Switzerland from 1914 to 1918. Another is a book by Johann Caspar Ulrich, who was the first Christian author to write a history of Swiss Jews in the mid-18th-century. The contemporary Swiss writer Charles Lewinsky was inspired by a 1938 edition of the Israelitisches Wochenblatt: the protagonist Felix Grün in Lewinsky's family saga Melnitz. Not only is the ICZ library a rich cultural and historical source for Judaism in Switzerland because of its collection of the complete volumes of the Israelitisches Wochenblatt newspaper, the library is also a central place for the examination of Jewish identity, and with yourself, according to literature professor Andreas Kilcher. The importance of the library was also illustrated during the debate on its possible break-up: The library is full of hidden comments to ourselves. There was public discussion on outsourcing the scientific inventory to the Zurich Central Library for financial reasons, however, by the end of 2014, the Verein für Jüdische Kultur und Wissenschaft (literally: Association for Jewish Culture and Science) had managed to collect CHF 250,000 from foundations and private donations, thus ensuring the financing of the library for another three years.

== Historical archives ==
The ICZ holds the second-largest historical archives of Swiss Jewish contemporary history, after the records of the Verband Schweizerischer Jüdischer Fürsorgen (VSJF), literally the Association of Jewish Swiss Welfare Services. The rich and diverse archives contain both written and audio-visual media, among them photographs of ICZ presidents and personalities, sound films, interviews, e.g. with Sigi Feigel, speeches by Shimon Peres and Willy Brandt, and a 1939 film showing the laying of the foundation stone of the community center, allowing a deep insight into Jewish life and work in Zürich. The social section comprises hundreds of personal files and index cards, along with the minutes of community meetings and board meetings. In addition to these, the records include numerous external contacts, and illustrations of the political and cultural commitment of the ICZ, which verify the community's regional, national and international positions. Antisemitism, racism, and the examination of WWII are the most important topics in these documents. The extensiveness and antiquity of the educational and religious materials, compared to other documents, show the importance of these areas for the Jewish community. The first yearbook of religious education, and certificates illustrating the acquisition of land for the community's synagogue date back to the 1880s. The 150th anniversary of the ICZ in June 2012 saw the completion of indexing of the historical archives of the ICZ. The institutional records have a volume of 85 running metres, but for organisational reasons, documents of the rabbinate and from the heads and members of many committees, remain in the care of the ICZ.

== School ==
The religious school was attended by 80 children in 1884. In 1894, there were 130 students, and 18 years later, 230. The community had its own schoolhouse from 1898.

== Community center ==
The community center in Zürich-Enge was modernized in 2010. There was "poor relief" from 1901, however, social care for the sick and elderly, for refugees, and for people otherwise in need of help, has been an important part of the ICZ since its foundation.

== Cemeteries ==
=== Unterer Friesenberg ===
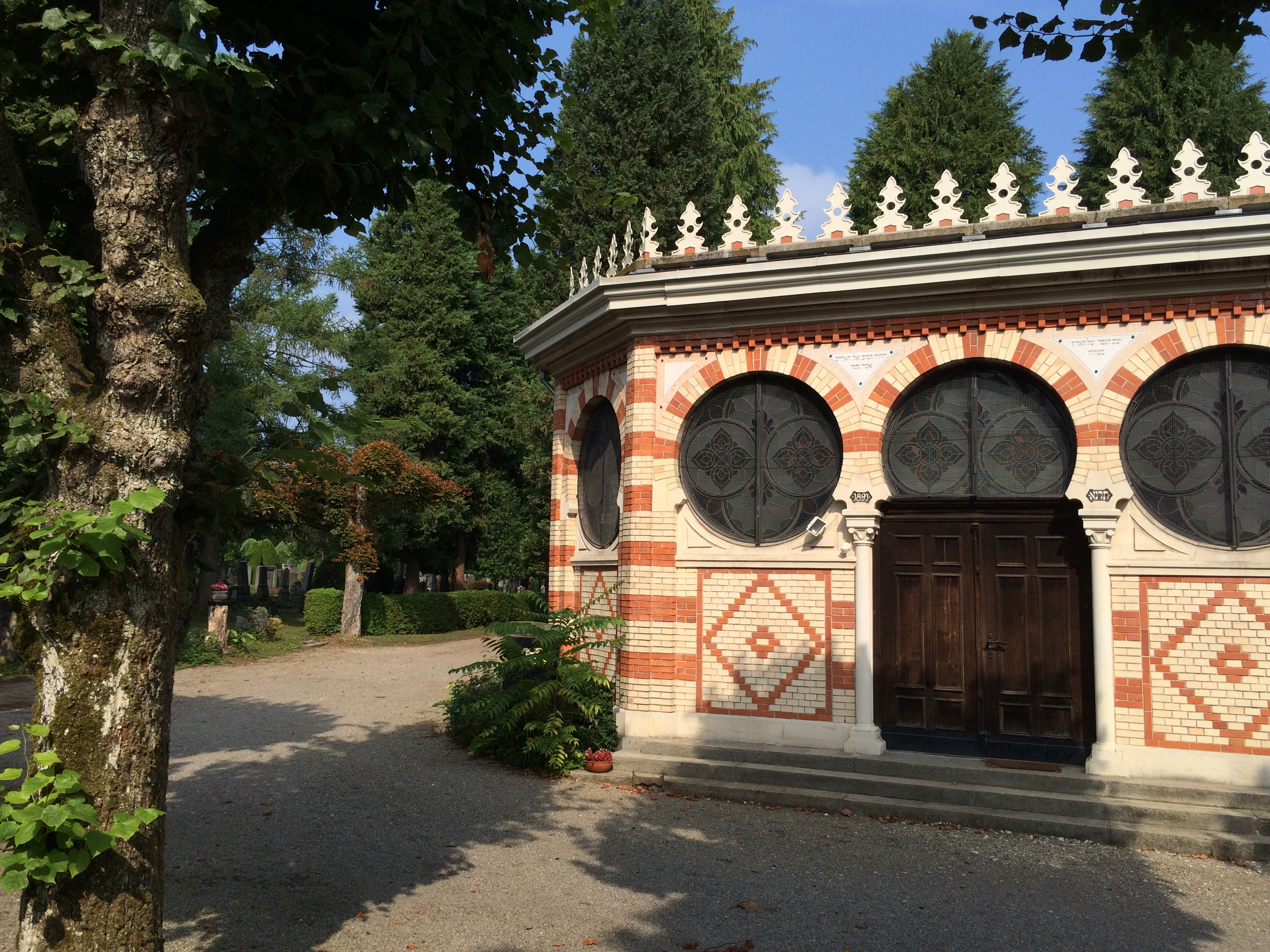
Cemetery hall at Unterer Friesenberg cemetery

On 5 July 1865, the Jewish community, which at that time numbered 30 members, noted the acquisition of a field to use as a cemetery. On 31 May 1866 it was inaugurated on occasion of the first funeral of a Jewish woman by the Lengnau Rabbi Dr. Meyer Kayserling. In 1892 a cemetery hall was built in the so-called Moorish style. After several expansions, a large second site was bought in 1916, and today the cemetery area comprises 0.17354 hectares (0.43 acres). Since the installation of the second cemetery in 1952, fewer and fewer burials were done at the very first Jewish cemetery in Zürich since the 14th century. Notable interments include Felix Salten (1860–1945), Joseph Schmidt (1904–1942) and Otto Klemperer (1885–1973).

=== Obererer Friesenberg ===
The second ICZ cemetery was inaugurated in 1952 and extended in 1988, and it covers an area of 3.4618 hectares (8.55 acres). At the cemetery grounds there is a large cemetery hall with rooms for ablution (Tahara). The glass windows of the cemetery hall were designed by the Jewish artist Régine Heim-Freudenreich (1907–2004). A memorial stone (limestone cube) by Susi Guggenheim Weil recalls the victims of in the Nazi era. Notable interments include Hermann Levin Goldschmidt (1914–1998), Kurt Hirschfeld (1902–1964), Mascha Kaléko (1907–1975), Erwin Leiser (1923–1996), Albert Pulmann (1893–1965), Jenny Splatter Schaner (1907–1996), Margarete Susman (1872–1966), Lydia Woog (1913–2003), and Sigi Feigel (1921–2004), the former ICZ president.

On 6 July 2015 the ICZ loosened the funeral arrangements for women. Henceforth, women are allowed at the funeral of a relative or friend and can participate in all burial rites. Previously, related women had to wait along with the rest of the female mourners at the wayside and were not admitted to the grave, at least officially. In reality the presence of women at the grave has been tacitly accepted, but, on the initiative of Chana Berlowitz, the municipal assembly decided a valid determination to change this old tradition. The women are therefore allowed not only to the grave of their relatives or friends who have died, they may also participate in the blades or speak the funeral prayer. In addition, the segregation among the mourners at the funeral chapel was abolished.

== Security measures ==
The danger for the Jewish community has increased continuously since the 2000s, and since the terrorist attacks on Jewish people in France and Belgium, the risk situation has become even more precarious. According to Swiss security experts, the current investments in security are at best adequate, but compared with France rather modest. Even the French government contributes to the security costs of the French Jewish communities, while the financial burden in Switzerland is supported solely by the Jewish communities. Because there is no state support for the protection of religious minorities in Switzerland, the municipality must pay for it themselves. Considering that, the Jewish community in Zürich urges government support for the rising security costs. Monitoring personnel, video surveillance and bulletproof windows are among the standard safety measures in Zürich. The security costs are further increased and almost unsustainable for the Jewish communities, the Zürich police chief Richard Wolff said in an interview with the Tages-Anzeiger newspaper. Hence, the Jewish community stands like no other Swiss minorities in the focus of terrorist attacks. Wolff is responding to the demands of Shella Kerész, president of the ICZ, and the city of Zürich should take over half of the safety issues. For years, the Jewish community invested around 800,000 Swiss Francs (CHF) for the protection of their 2,500 community members, and these expenditures would be doubled within two years. In December 2015, a meeting on the situation of the Jewish minority in Switzerland was held in Bern. The main theme of the meeting: the rising need for security. Police chief Wolff said on occasion of a panel discussion that the responsibility for protecting the Jewish fellow citizens the government has to assume responsibility. Even the Federal Department of Defence, Civil Protection and Sport (VBS), established under Guy Parmelin a working group to draw up measures to protect Jewish institutions. There are discussed different options, among them financial monitoring or police or army protection, considering if the Swiss Convention for the Protection of National Minorities (Rahmenabkommen zum Schutz nationaler Minderheiten 1999) may provide the legal legitimacy. The Canton of Zürich, because it is home to the largest Jewish community with around 6,000 members, could serve as a Swiss national model.

== Cultural heritage ==
The building of the Synagoge Zürich Löwenstrasse is listed in the Swiss inventory of cultural property of national and regional significance as a Class B object of regional importance, the ICZ library in Zürich-Enge at the Arboretum Zürich even as a Class A object of national importance.

== People associated with the ICZ ==
- Sigi Feigel (1921–2004)
- Kurt Hirschfeld (1902–1964)
- Daniel Jositsch (born 1965)
- Otto Klemperer (1885–1973)
- Marcel Lang (1956–2009)
- Erwin Leiser (1923–1996)
- Charles Lewinsky (born 1946)
- Mordechai Piron (Hebrew: מרדכי פירון; born Egon Pisk (1921–2014)
- Felix Salten (1869–1945)
- Joseph Schmidt (1904–1942)
- Adin Steinsaltz (Hebrew: עדין שטיינזלץ) or Adin Even Yisrael (Hebrew: עדין אבן ישראל) (born 1937)
- Margarete Susman (1872–1966)

== See also ==
- History of the Jews in Switzerland
- Surbtal Jews
