= Figiel =

Figiel is a Polish surname. It may be derived from the Polish nickname "figiel" literally meaning "prank", "joke" or from the German surname Feigel, Figel. Historical feminine forms: from husband's surname: Figielowa, Figlowa; from father's surname: Figielówna, Figlówna, Figlanka. Notable people with the surname include:

- Aneta Figiel (born 1980), Polish singer
- Marzena Figiel Strzała, Polish traveler, journalist and author
- Sia Figiel (1967–2026), Samoan novelist, poet, and painter
- Tadeusz Figiel (1948–2025), Polish mathematician

== See also ==
- Feigel
- Figl
