= Fiegel =

Fiegel is a surname. Notable people with the surname include:

- Frank "Rocky" Fiegel (1868–1947), American bartender and laborer, reputed to be the real-life inspiration for Popeye
- Michael Fiegel, American writer and game designer

== See also ==
- Feigel
- Figiel
