= Neumarkt, Zurich =

Square in Zürich, Switzerland

Neumarkt
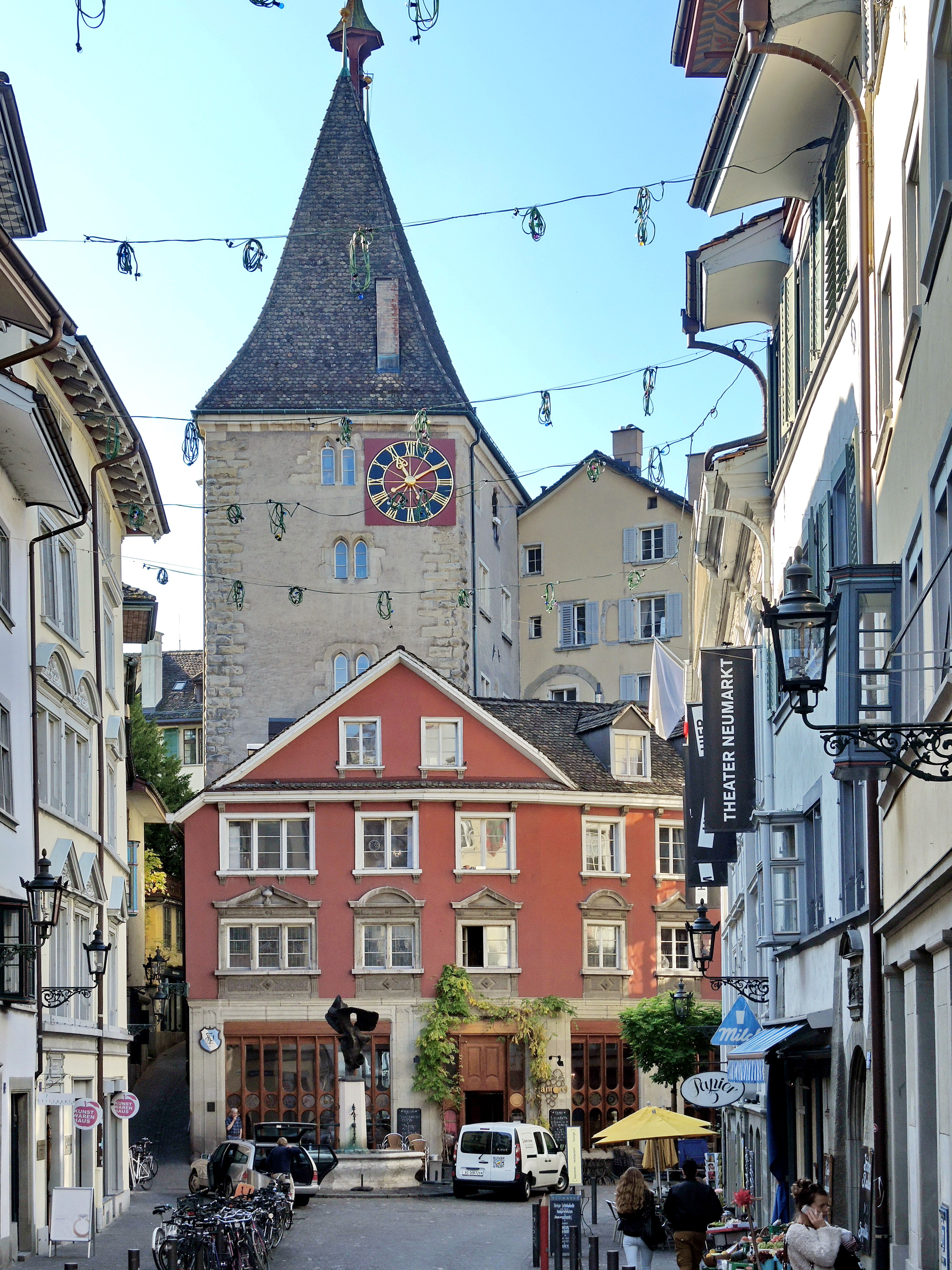
- Neumarkt as seen from Seilergraben towards Grimmenturm
- Former name(s): Neuer Markt
- Type: street and public square
- Owner: City of Zürich
- Addresses: Neumarkt
- Location: Zürich, Switzerland
- Postal code: 8001
- Coordinates: 47°22′21.897583″N 8°32′45.526199″E

Construction
- Commissioned: late 11th century AD

Neumarkt is a street and a historical area in the Rathaus quarter (Altstadt) of Zürich, Switzerland.

== Geography ==
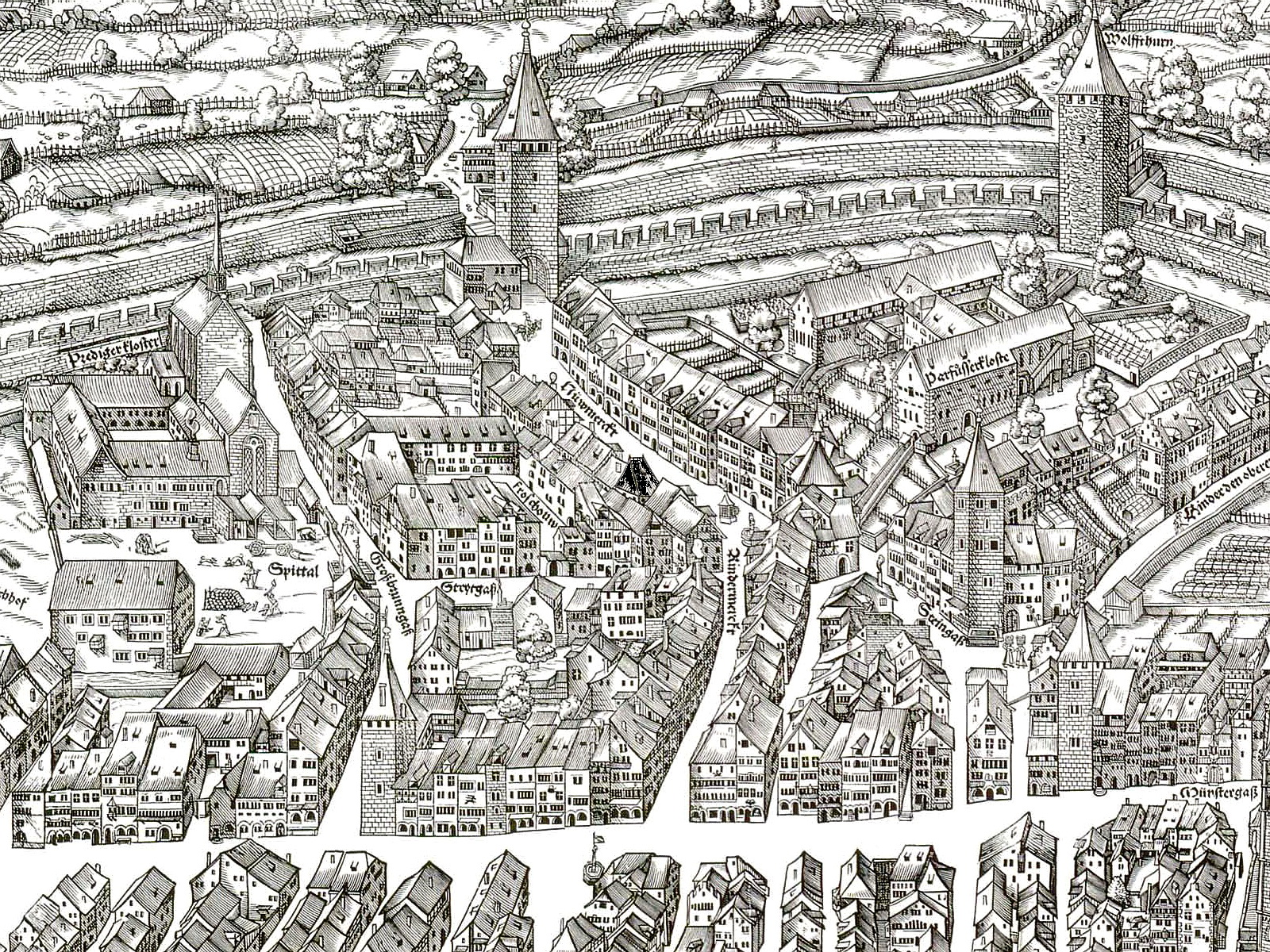
Neumarkt on the so-called Murerplan of 1576, Predigerkirche to the left

Neumarkt is bounded by Spiegelgasse, Rindermarkt, Froschauergasse and Seilergraben streets in the Rathaus quarter (Altstadt) on the right bank of the river Limmat, and Grimmenturm is a landmark seen from all location around the inner city of Zürich.

== History ==
In the 12th century AD, the as of today Neumarkt street was built as a new suburb of the medieval city of Zürich, centered around the new city market (in German: Neuer Markt). The previous Alte Markt (literally: old market) was established so far at the Marktgasse street and perhaps also towards Stüssihofstatt square. Some buildings, among them Grimmenturm and Bilgeriturm, may allow the conclusion that the new district also completed the so-called first city fortifications to the west. In 1249, a pogrom against the Jewish people in Switzerland occurred among other cities in Zürich; the homes of the Jewish people were seized or destroyed and many Jewish citizens were killed by the mob.

Neumarkt was first mentioned in the city archives related to the sale of a house: Ulrich, the treasurer of the Probstei Zürich sealed and confirmed on 26 November 1311 that Mia, Gattin des [wife of] Werner Waltersbacher sold her slip of the pen of her endowment on a house...to Mechtild, Witwe von [widow of] Burkard Waltersbacher. The former Neumarkttor or Kronentor gate at Seilergraben was built probably at the end of the 13th century, serving as gatetower, first mentioned in 1340 as Nünmargtsturm and since 1637 as Neumarktstor. The tower was also equipped in the 16th century with a clock and an ornate dial, but was broken in 1829. The fountain in the square dates back to the 15th century. Its Jupiter stone fountain-sculpture from 1750 was vandalized in 1987 and the sculpture and its pedestal replaced in 1992 by a bronze sculpture (on a new stone pedestal) of the greek goddess of victory "Nike". And so the former Jupiter Brunnen (fountain) is now called the Nike-Brunnen.

== Visitor attractions ==
=== Buildings ===
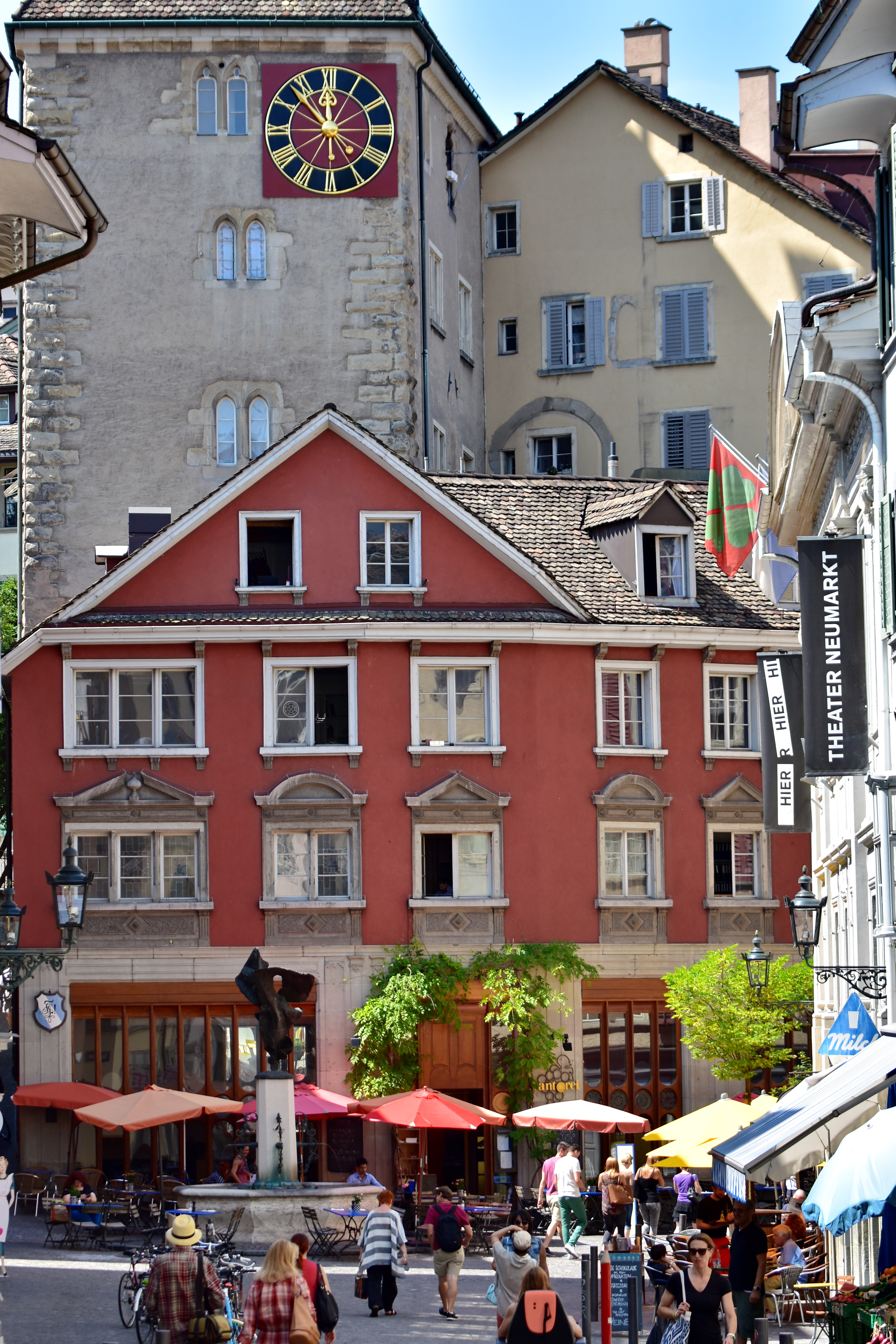
Grimmenturm

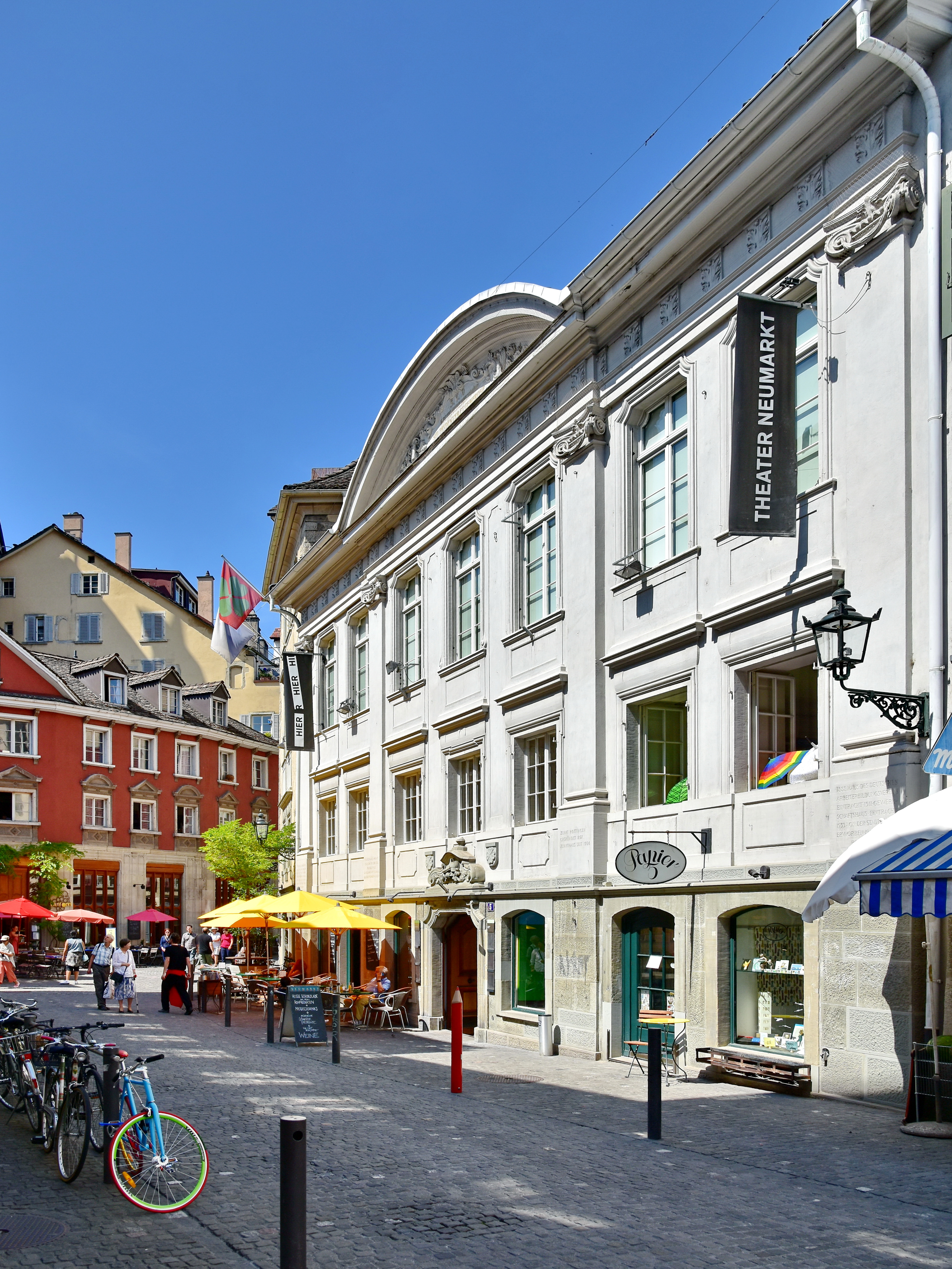
Theater am Neumarkt

Being the most remarkable landmarks, the Grimmenturm and the neighbouring Bilgeriturm (as well a guild house) buildings are remains of the former second, even first fortification of the medieval city of Zürich, both serving as of today as well-known restaurants. Some meters nearby there are the city archives (in German: Stadtarchiv) situated in the remarkable Haus zum Rechberg, including a historical exhibition and a scale model of the historical city. Another point of interest is the theater situated at the Bilgeriturm, the so-called Theater am Neumarkt which also is serving as a guild house. Also remarkable are the late medieval historical houses, among them Haus zum Mohrenkopf, the former home of Katharina von Zimmern, the last abbess of the Fraumünster Abbey.

=== Synagogengasse ===
Nearly hidden, the narrow alleyway Synagogengasse marks the area of the former historical Jewish quarter of Zürich. In 2002, the building Froschaugasse 4 was the location of archeological excavations. The former building Zur Judenschule ("Jewish school") was so named in the 18th century because it housed the medieval synagogue of Zürich. In 1363, it was called "Judenschuol" (a medieval term in Zürich for a Synagogue), and some remains of the interior structure date before 1423, when Jewish citizens had do leave Zürich, and the synagogue was repealed. Obscured by later layers of plaster remained a small remnant of the late-medieval room adornment was found on occasion of the surveys, including fragments of a wall painting from the 14th century in the form of leaf tendrils in red and black color. The painting adorns a ground floor room.

On 25 February 1354, the citizenry of Zürich allowed to Jewish residents having "Husroeichi" (an old Swiss-German term meaning a house with a separate chimney) to live within the town walls, and they were secured by the municipal law, but there were some restrictions and additions, namely related to testimony, and loans and pawnbroking. On request of the city council of Zürich to the diocese of Konstanz, the Jewish citizens of Zürich were allowed by Bishop Heinrich to renew the Synagogue and the cemetery, under the reserve that exclusively Jews who resided (namely Burgrecht) in Zürich may be buried.

At the location of the former Synagogue, a plaque was mounted; it served as a storeroom, now a bookstore, and was never re-used as a Synagogue. In 1862 the Jewish community of Zürich, the present Israelitische Cultusgemeinde Zürich (ICZ) was re-established, which built the Synagoge Zürich at the Löwenstrasse road in 1884.

== Gallery ==
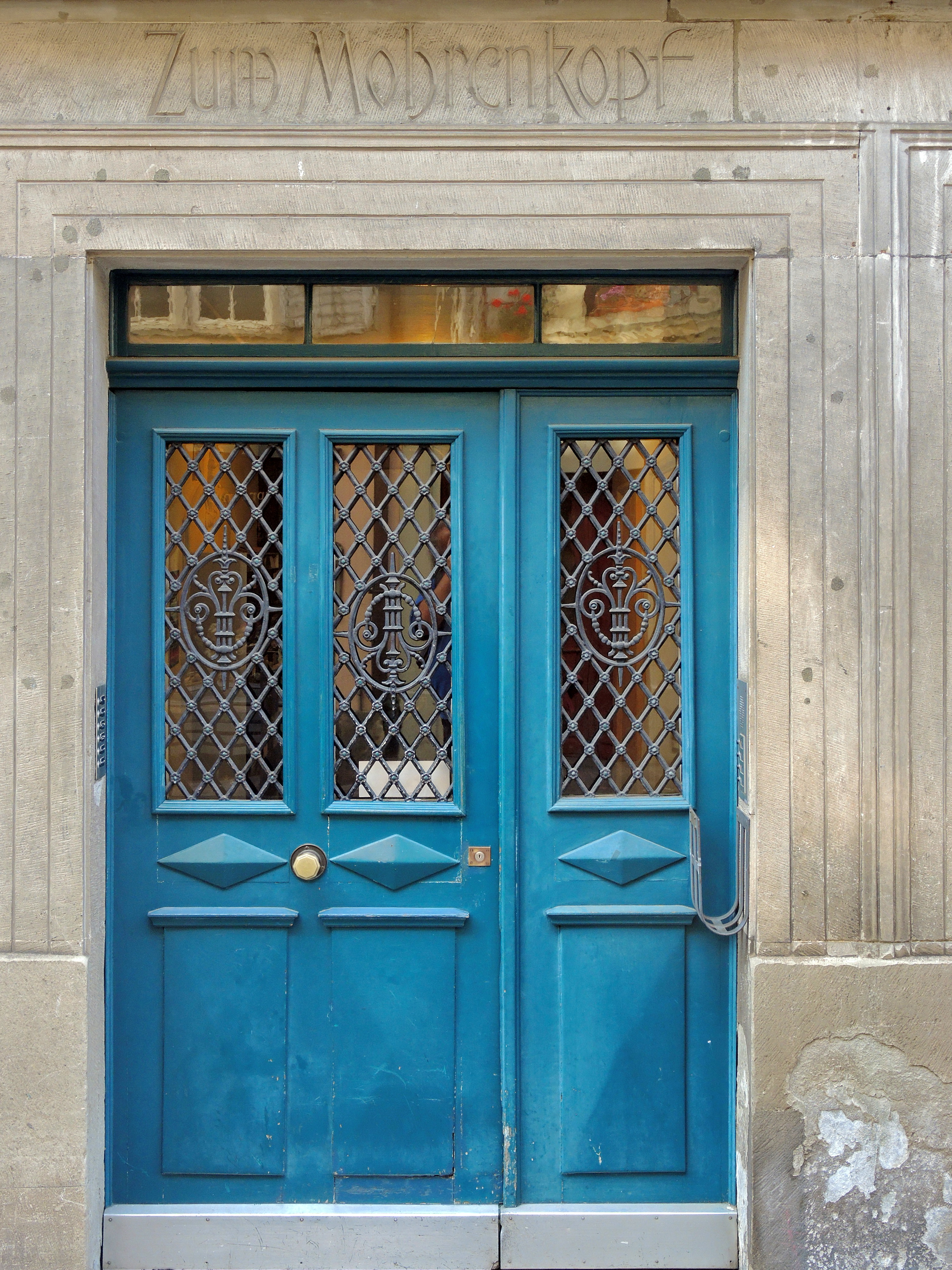
Mohrenkopf house of Katharina von Zimmern

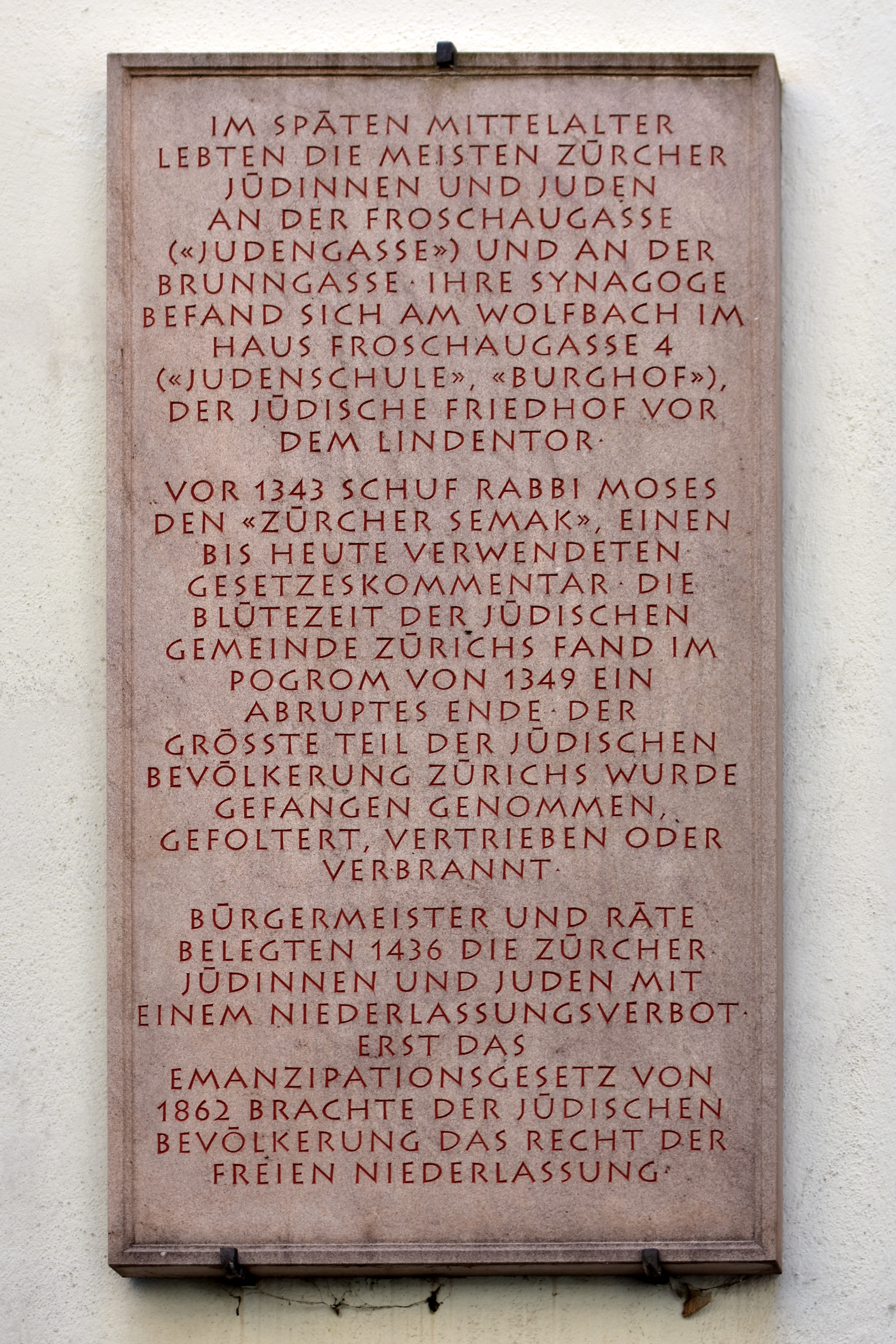
Synagogengasse

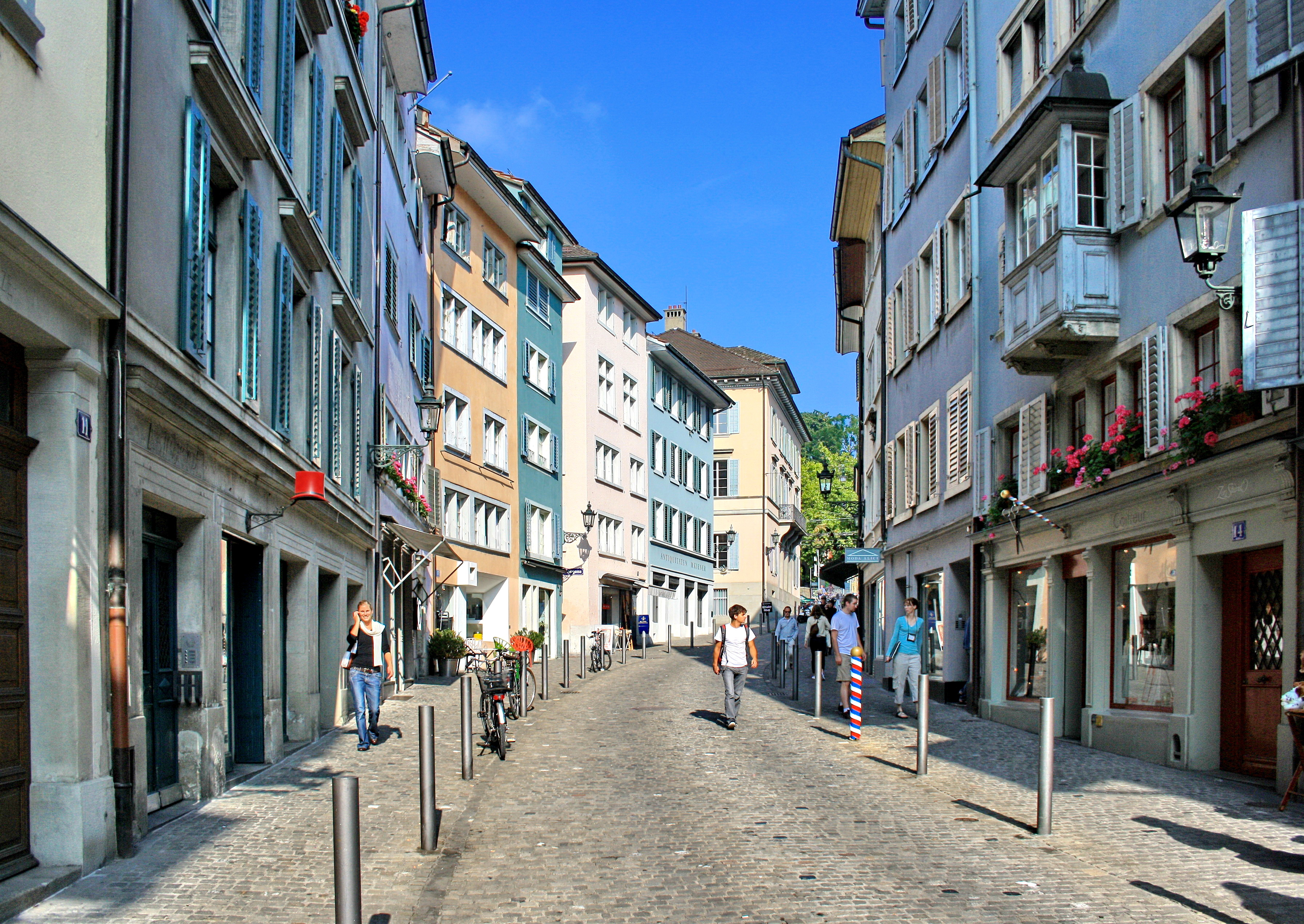
Neumarkt towards Seilergraben

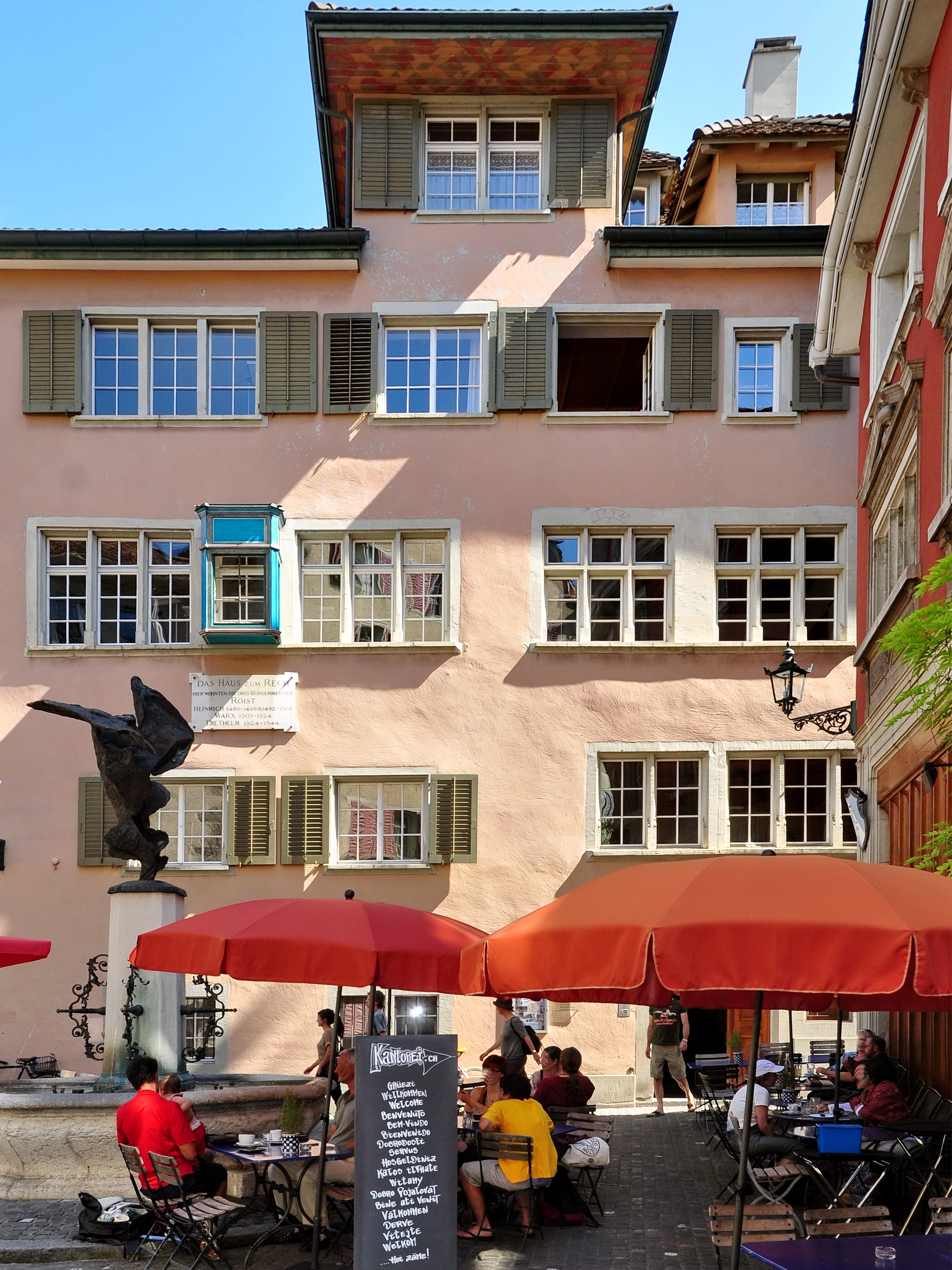
Haus zum Rechberg

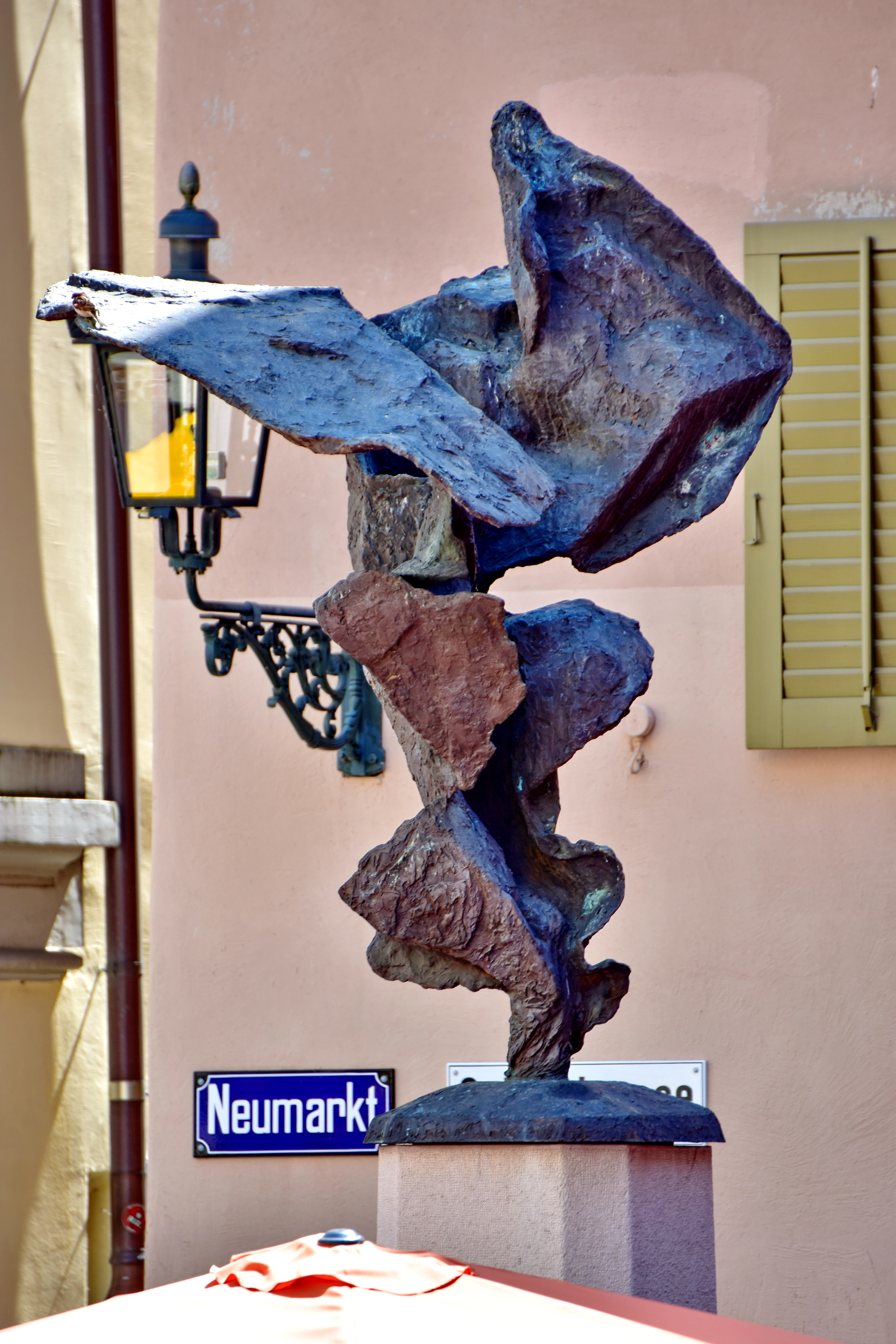
Nike fountain (after the Greek goddess of victory "Nike" decorating it) Bronze sculpture by Swiss sculptor Barbara Roth

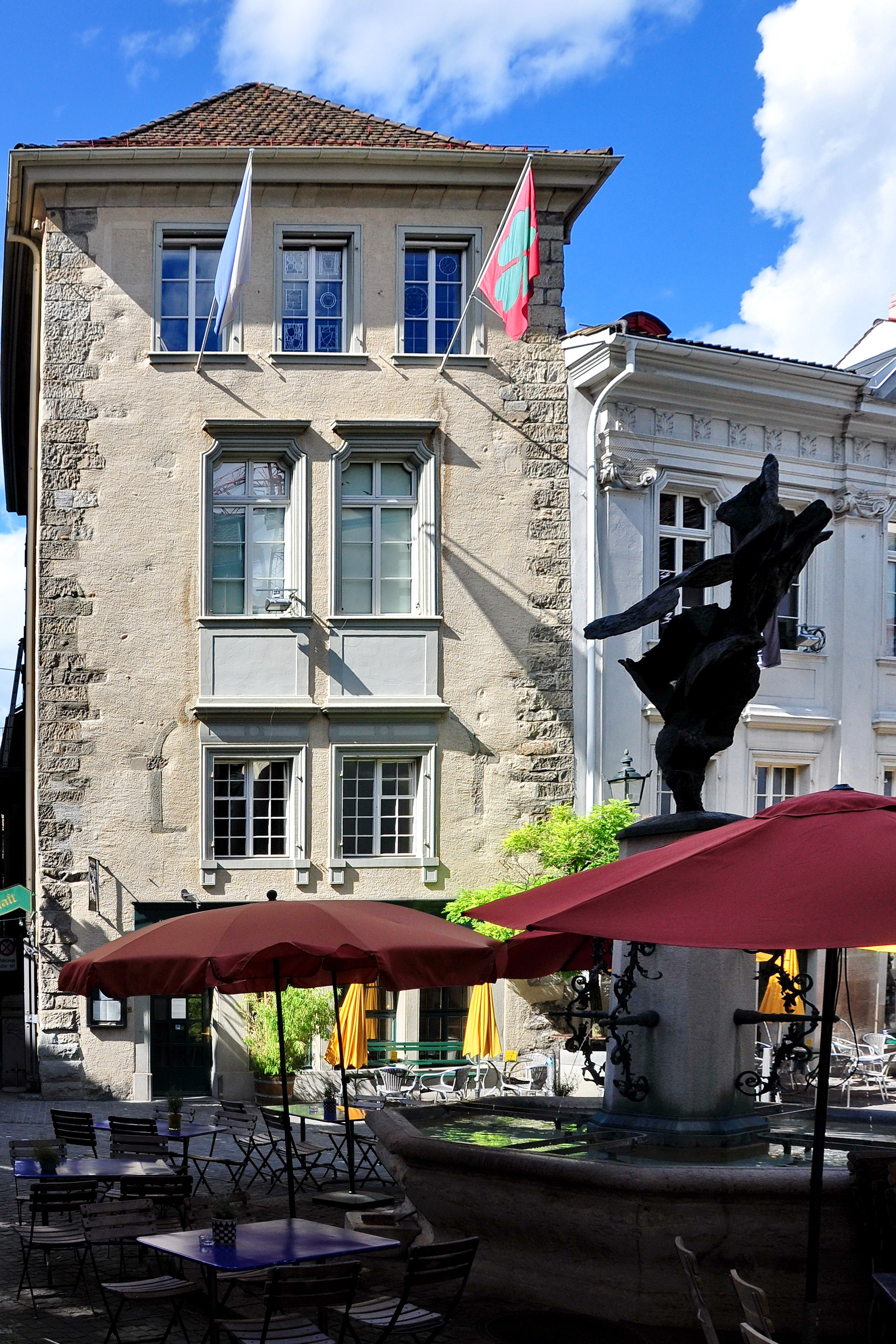
Bilgeriturm and Nike fountain, Synagogengasse to the left
