= Strzała =

Strzała may refer to:

- Strzała, Łódź Voivodeship, village in Poland
- Strzała, Masovian Voivodeship, village in Poland
- Marzena Figiel Strzała, Polish traveler, journalist and author

== See also ==
- Strela (disambiguation)
