= Feige (surname) =

Feige is a surname. Notable people with the surname include:

- Claude Feige (born 1958), French curler
- David Feige, American lawyer, legal commentator and author
- Eric Feige (born 1961), American politician
- Gerhard Feige (born 1951), bishop of the Roman Catholic Diocese of Magdeburg, Germany
- Guido Benno Feige (1937–2007), German lichenologist and botanist
- Hans Feige (1880–1953), German General der Infantrie in the Wehrmacht during World War II
- Jasmin Feige (1959–1988), West German long and high jumper
- Julius Feige (1861–1918), American businessman and politician
- Kevin Feige (born 1973), American film producer
- Uriel Feige, Israeli computer scientist

== See also ==
- Chang Fei, Taiwanese singer and television personality (nicknamed Fei Ge)
- Feigl
- Feigel
