= Feigl =

Feigl is a surname. Notable people with the surname include:

- Bedřich Feigl (1884–1965), Czech painter, graphic artist and illustrator
- Brady Feigl (born 1990), American professional baseball players
- Erich Feigl (1931–2007), Austrian journalist, writer and film maker
- Fred Feigl (1867-1933), American publisher and military officer
- Fritz Feigl (1891–1971), Austrian-Brazilian chemist
- Georg Feigl (1890–1945), German mathematician
- Herbert Feigl (1902–1988), Austrian philosopher
- Peter Feigl (born 1951), Austrian tennis player
- Polly Feigl, American biostatistician

== See also ==
- Eric Feigl-Ding (born 1983), American health scientist
- Feige
- Figl
