= Erwin Leiser =

Swedish director, writer and actor

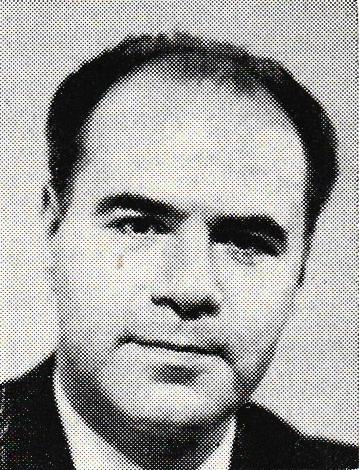
Erwin Leiser SFL

Erwin Leiser (May 16, 1923 – August 22, 1996) was a Swedish director, writer, and actor. He is best known for his documentary Mein Kampf (film) (1959), based on Nazi footage from secret archives and depicting Nazi atrocities.

== Early life and education ==
Born and raised in Berlin, he fled to Sweden at the age of 15 to escape the Nazi Party. He graduated from the University of Lund and worked as a journalist and a drama and literary critic.

== Career ==
Leiser was born in Berlin on 16 May 1923 and fled Nazi Germany in 1938; he settled in Sweden, studied at Lund University and began his professional life as a journalist and a drama/literary critic in the 1950s.

From 1959 Leiser began documentary filmmaking, using archive and newsreel footage to show the rise of National Socialism and the role of cinema and propaganda in the Third Reich. His film Mein Kampf (film) (1959) used German and Allied footage and received international distribution.

During the 1960s and 1970s, Leiser produced documentaries of Nazi Germany, the Holocaust, and Nazi cinema. In 1967 he served on the jury of the 28th Venice International Film Festival. In 1974 he wrote Nazi Cinema, about film and propaganda in Nazi Germany.

=== Filmography ===
- Mein Kampf (film) (1959)
- Den blodiga tiden (1960)
- Eichmann und das Dritte Reich (Eichmann – dödens agent) (1961)
- Välj livet (1963)
- Deutschland, erwache! (1968)
- Zum Beispiel Fritz Lang (1968)
- Keine Welt für Kinder (1972)
- Ich lebe in der Gegenwart – Versuch über Hans Richter (1973)
- Leben nach dem Überleben (1982)
- Die Mitläufer (1985)
- Hiroshima – Erinnern oder Vergessen? (1985)
- Following the Fuhrer (1986)
- Die Welt im Container (1987)
- Hitlers Sonderauftrag Linz (1987)
- Eldprovet – novemberpogrom 1938 (1988)
- 1937 – Kunst und Macht (1992)
- Alla var med i Hitlerjugend (1992)
- Die UFA – Mythos und Wirklichkeit (1993)
- Pimpf war jeder (1993)
- Tio bröder var vi … (1995)
- Otto John: eine deutsche Geschichte (1995)
- Feindbilder (1995)
- Hela mitt liv har varit en konst: en film om Otte Sköld (1996)

=== Selected publications ===
- Leiser, Erwin. *A Pictorial History of Nazi Germany*. Penguin, 1962.
- Leiser, Erwin (1974). Nazi Cinema. Macmillan. ISBN 9780020124009 – via archive.org.

== Death ==
Erwin Leiser was buried in Zürich's Israelitischer Friedhof Oberer Friesenberg.
