= Marcel Lang =

Swiss singer and cantor (1956–2009)

Marcel Lang (June 13, 1956 – June 27, 2009) was a Swiss chazan (cantor) and singer (tenor).

== Life ==
Marcel Lang was born in Basel into a family in which the East European Jewish tradition of chazanut (cantorial art) was cultivated. After first training as a commercial clerk, he studied singing with Kurt Widmer and Hans Riediker at the Music Academy of Basel and the affiliated opera studio. After qualifying as a singing teacher, he studied at the Zurich Institute of Applied Psychology. In his capacity as a certified psychologist, Marcel Lang acted as a consultant to companies and advised clients. He worked as psychological advisor at the Music Academy of Basel and taught psychopedagogy at the College of Music in Basel.

Beginning in the late 1970s, Marcel Lang was the cantor in the Jewish community of Zürich (Israelitische Cultusgemeinde Zürich (ICZ)) and in a number of small synagogues. From 1982 until 1991 he was senior cantor at the Jewish community in Basel. He then worked as the permanent guest cantor in the Jewish community of Düsseldorf before returning to the Jewish community in Zurich in 2004. In addition, he performed in concerts and worked as a teacher. He appeared both as a solo performer of synagogal music and Yiddish songs and as a singer of classical lieder, operas and oratorios. His concerts took him throughout Europe and to North America, Australia and Israel. He produced a number of CDs featuring recordings of Yiddish songs and synagogal music accompanied by choirs, piano, chamber ensembles and klezmer bands. As a teacher he prepared students for their bar mitzvah over a period of 30 years. A connoisseur of Jewish song, prayer-leading and liturgy, he taught, advised and supported groups and individuals. Among other things, he worked at the Institute for Jewish Studies in Heidelberg as an instructor of “chazanut” and, from 1999, introduced members of the Jewish-pluralist Basel association “Ofek” to the liturgical structure of prayer-leading. He imparted his expert knowledge of Ashkenazi song culture and Yiddish songs on numerous lecture tours.

With his knowledge and love of both orthodox and liberal Judaism, Marcel Lang felt at home in the various streams of Judaism throughout his life. He demonstrated this as cantor in the Jewish communities in Basel and Zurich, which are confronted with a heterogeneous membership, and in the Jewish community in Düsseldorf, which has seen many Jews from the former Soviet Union who did not enjoy a Jewish education joining its ranks. Marcel Lang was also active in inter-religious dialogue. He introduced many young people to Judaism as part of their preparation for confirmation and presented Jewish religious practice in tours of the Basel synagogue and in lectures throughout German-speaking Switzerland.

== CD-Productions ==
- Ki wi jirbu jamecha - Songs of the synagogue (with choir)
- Kol demamah dakah (synagogal and chassidic duets)
- Majn Schtejtele Bels (shabbat songs and Yiddish lieder)
- Lieder jüdischer Avantgardisten der zwanziger Jahre (Songs of Jewish avant-gardists of the 1920s)
- Lechajim (together with klezmer band Bait Jaffe)
- Sing! – Gedenkst? (together with klezmer band Bait Jaffe)
- Sch'ma Kolenu (synagogal songs with the Zurich synagogue choir)
- Semirot Michal (table songs for shabbat)

== Sources ==
- Biography and d on saenger-schauspieler-kuenstler.com
