= Herbert C. Feig =

American politician

Herbert C. Feig (October 4, 1886 – February 14, 1975) was an American businessman and politician.

Feig was born in Atwater, Kandiyohi County, Minnesota and went to the Atwater parochial and public schools. Feig lived in Raymond, Minnesota and was in the banking business. He served as Mayor of Raymond, Minnesota, with the Raymond City Council, and with the Raymond School Board. Feig also in the Minnesota House of Representatives from 1941 to 1946. He died in a nursing home in Willmar, Minnesota.
