= Fred Feigl =

American publisher

Fred Feigl

Frederick Feigl (August 24, 1863 − 10 December 1933) was a German-American publisher and a military officer. He was the publisher of The Tammany Times (later renamed The Political Review), a weekly magazine which carried various departments such as social news and a women's section, but was primarily devoted to the defense of Tammany Hall.

Feigl was born in Bethnal Green, London, to Austrian-German parents, He emigrated to the United States in 1871 as a German citizen but returned to England.

He moved to Texas, and became a reporter on The Houston Post, moving to New York in 1892. He became managing editor of Texas Siftings, a humor magazine. In 1898, he married Jane Mauldin.

He enlisted with the Texas National Guard and saw service with the Texas Rangers on the Mexican frontier. In World War I he became chief of the Bureau of Special Service, a branch of the New York city police that arrested people considered disloyal. His son, Jeff Feigl, was the first American artillery officer killed in World War I.
