= Marzena Figiel Strzała =

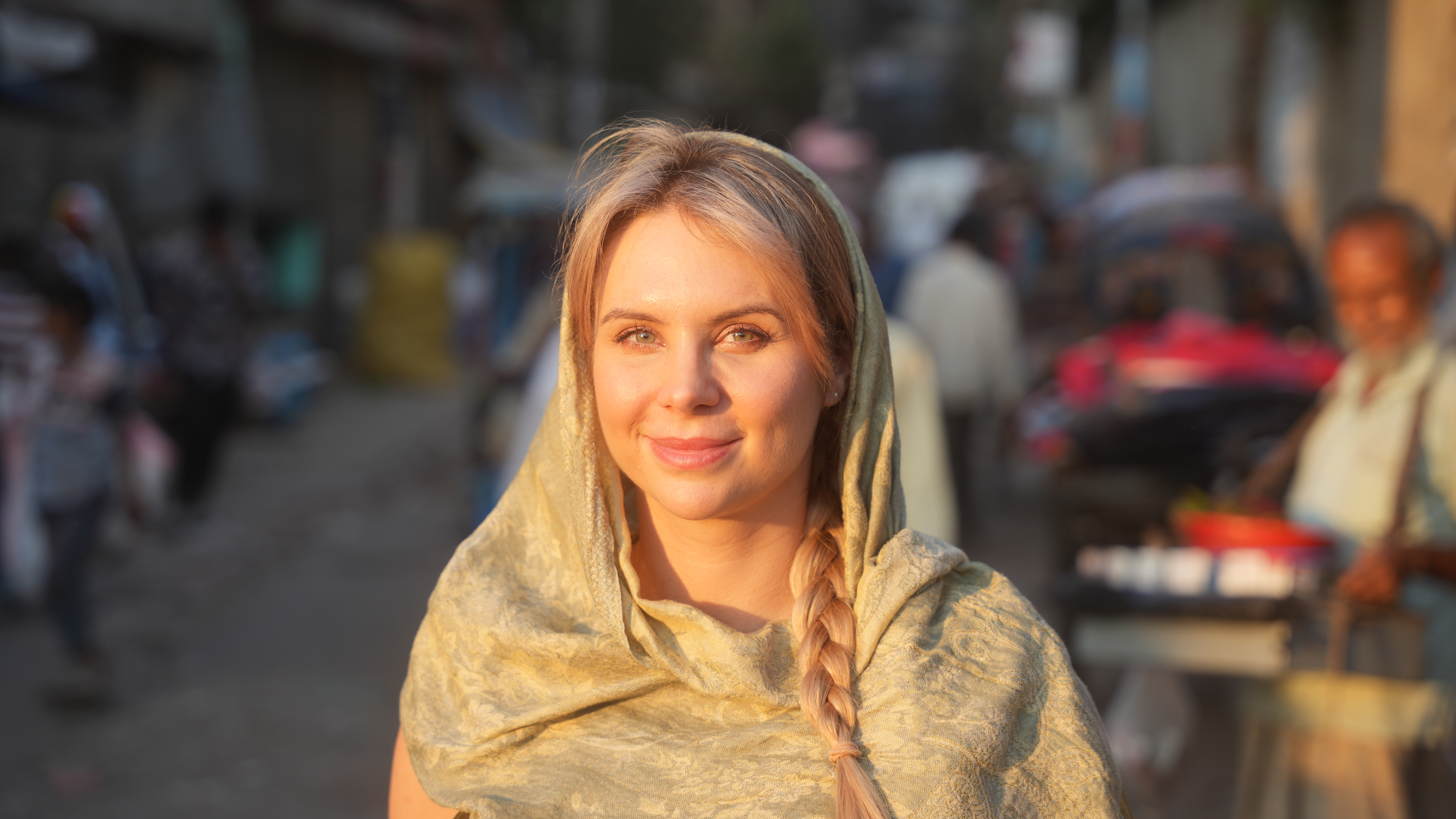
Marzena Figiel Strzała, 2024

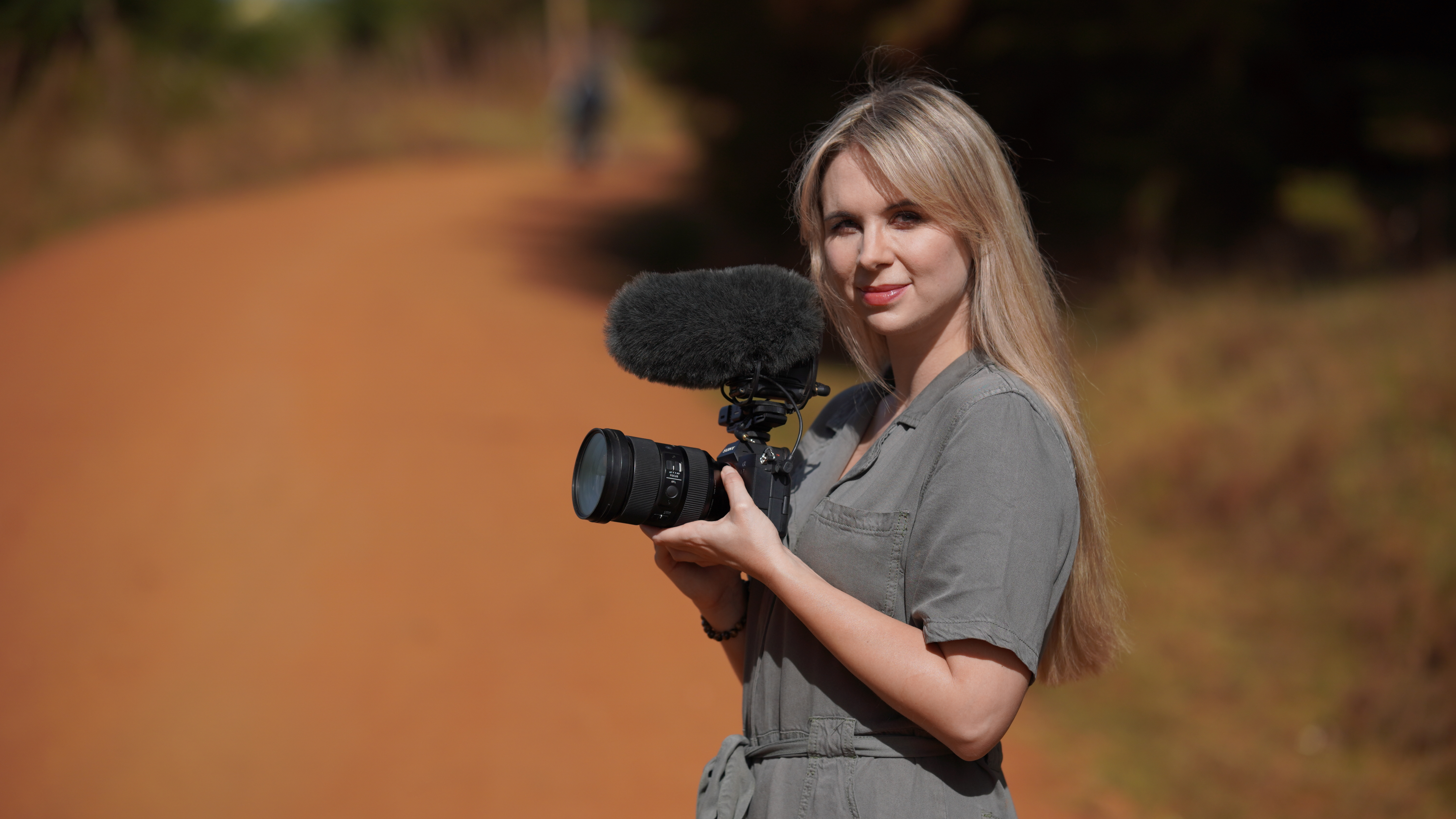
Marzena Figiel Strzała, 2025

Marzena Kinga Figiel Strzała is a Polish traveler, journalist, author of the Children of the World reportage series.

She was born in Zakopane, Poland and graduated with a master's degree from the Faculty of Journalism and Social Communication of the Jagiellonian University. After defending the title of drama actor before the Association of Polish Stage Artists, for about 10 years she worked as a professional actress

She is the founder of the Children of the World Foundation and the author of the series of reportages Children of the World (Polish: Dzieci Świata).

Ste is married to Damian Strzała, an actor. The couple constitute the board of the Children of the World Foundation.

== Recognition ==
- 2024: UNESCO Janusz Korczak Chair medal for the Children of the World reportages
