= Figl =

Figl is a surname. Notable people with the surname include:

- Leopold Figl (1902–1965), Austrian politician
- Robert Figl (born 1967), German wheelchair racer
