= Grimmenturm =

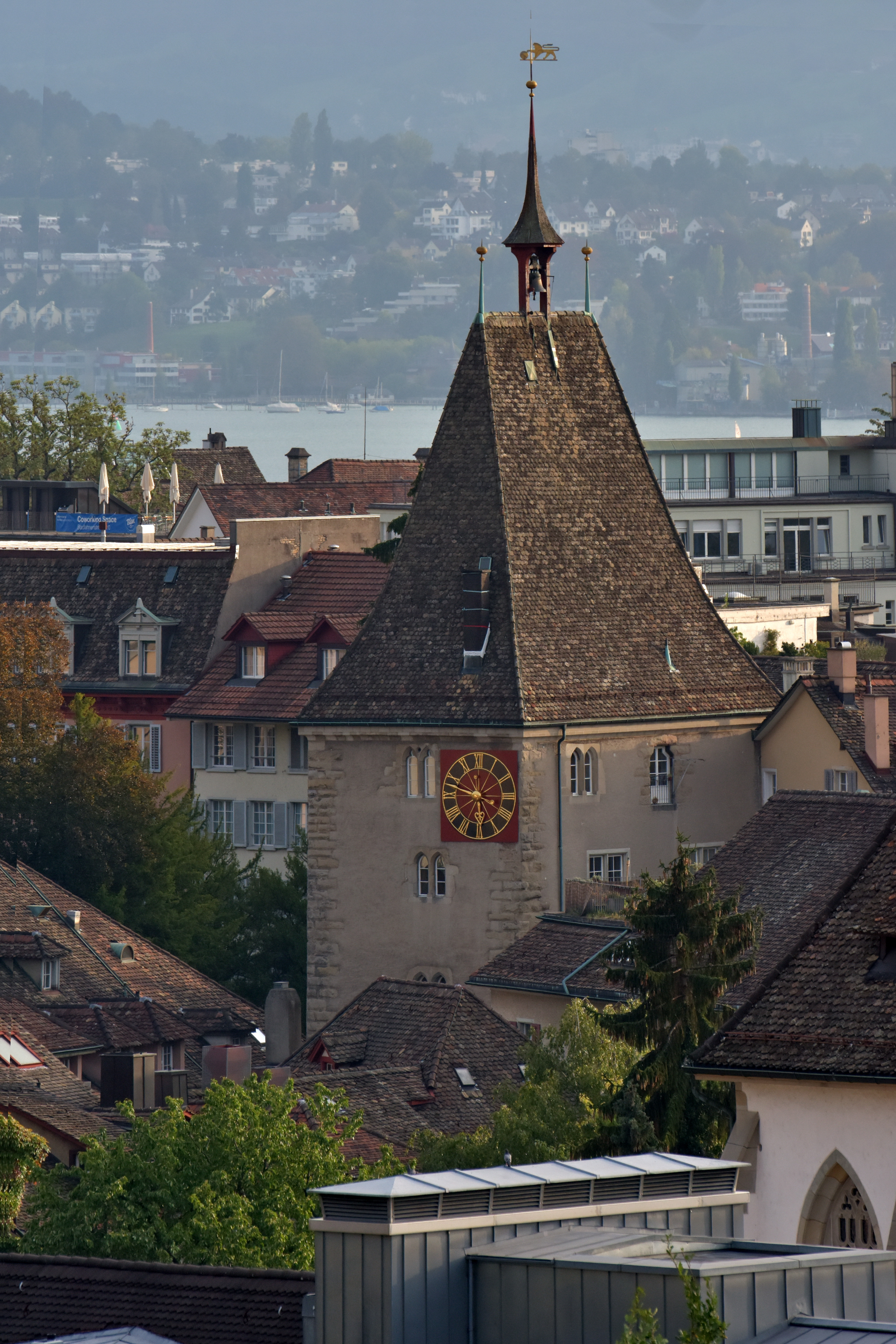
- Grimmenturm
- Interactive map of Grimmenturm
- 47.37231°N 8.54554°E
- Location: Neumarkt, Zürich

History
- Built: c. 1250–1280

Site notes
- Architectural styles: European Medieval, renewed in 1966
- Governing body: City of Zürich

Grimmenturm (lit. 'Tower of the grim', referring to Johann Bilgeri the younger, nicknamed 'the grim') is a medieval tower and restaurant situated at Neumarkt in Zurich's District 1, Switzerland.

== Location ==
The Grimmenturm building is situated at Neumarkt (Spiegelgasse 31, 8001 Zürich) in the Altstadt of Zürich on the right shore of the Limmat river. It houses the restaurant Neumarkt in one of the attached buildings towards Neumarkt.

== History ==
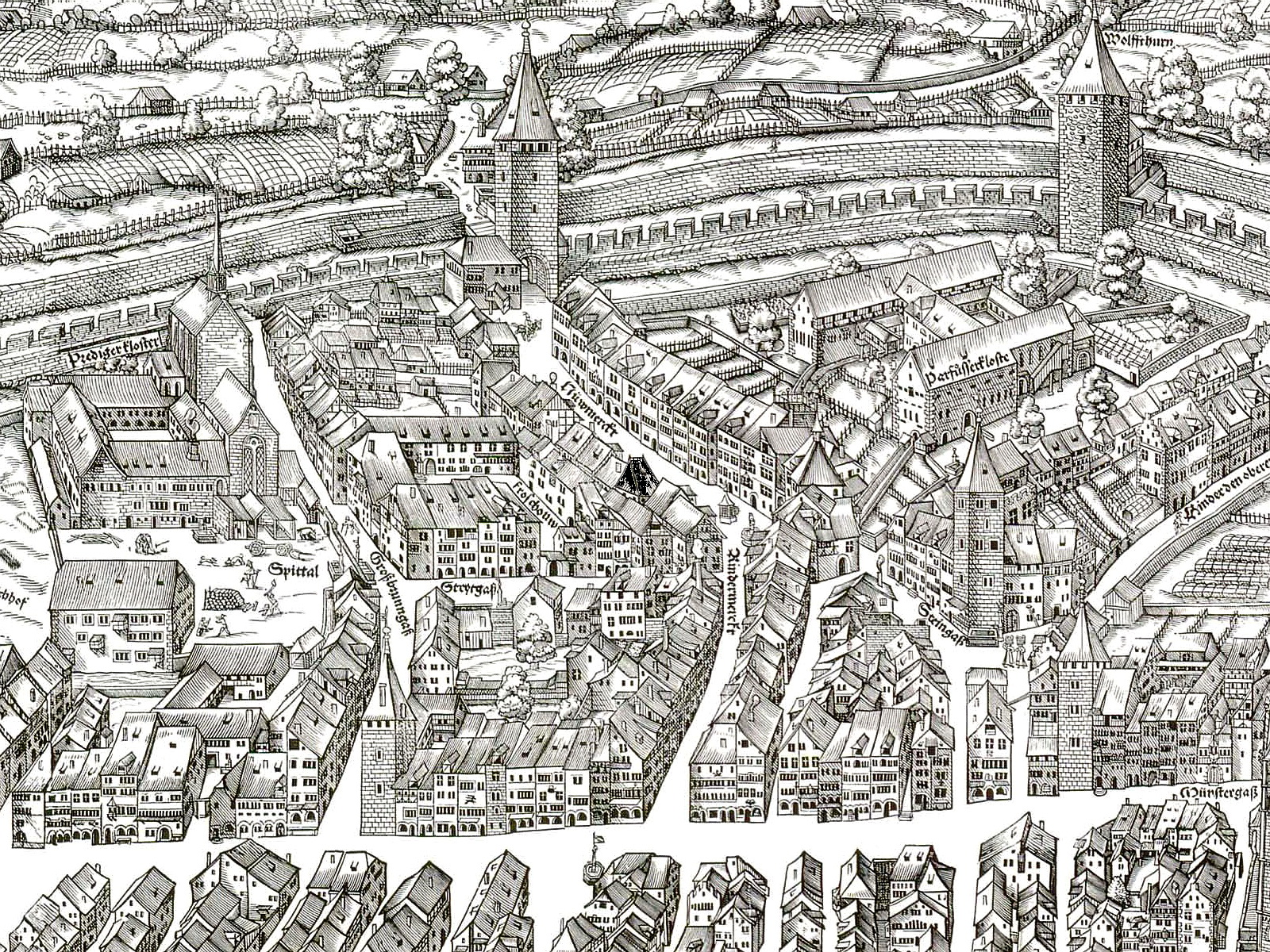
Neumarkt on the so-called Murerplan of 1576, Predigerkirche to the left.

The tower was probably built by the Zürich family Bilgeri (residential since 1256) between 1250 and 1280 AD as a residential tower. First mentioned in the year 1324 as a tower of the Pilgrin family, it was one of about 30 residential towers that existed in the European Middle Ages in Zürich. Even before 1300 housing was attached to the north-western side. Although the building was for decades used by the Bilgeri family as their home, it has not their name, as a building; also used as a residential tower, the so-called Bilgeriturm is located just 20 meters in the north. Grimmenturm's name was given by another member of the same family, Johann Bilgeri the younger and its nickname "Grimm" or "Grimme". Even the nickname Grimm (the same meaning in English and in German) was apparently so common that it even was mentioned in official documents, such as in a parchment from the year 1330 . On 12 July 1336 Rudolf Brun, mayor of the city of Zürich, defeated his political opponents, the former members of the Rat (council) of Zürich, of which around 12 members found refuge by count Johann I in Rapperswil. The document, sealed by the Princess Abbess of Fraumünster, the abbot of the Einsiedeln Abbey and the Propst von Zürich (Grossmünster), listed among others the names of Heinr. Bilgeri im Markt, Niclaus Bilgeri, Rudolf Bilgeri and Joh. Bilgeri der jüngere zum Steinbock to be banned at least two years from the city of Zürich.

In 1350 Sister Elsbeth Reinger handed over her house and paddock, located at the Neumarkt between the houses of Waser and Heinrich von Rapperswil to establish a hospital. Johann Pilgrim, der Grimme left over the tower together with residential buildings to the hospital for accommodation and nursing sisters, and so a monastic community was established. In occasion of the Reformation in Zürich, the nunnery was abolished in 1524, and the building was used as wine cellar and granary. The next 300 years the building served as a vicarage and accommodation building, and in 1962 it passed over to the city government of Zürich.

== Architecture ==
Being part of the former second, even first fortification of the medieval city of Zürich, the building has an extremely irregular, octagonal floor plan, consisting of three former separate buildings. On its northeast facade a lounge corner with Gothic pointed arch windows is installed. The so-called Zum Langen Keller (Rindermarkt 26, 8001 Zürich) residential building was attached to the northwestern side of the tower even before 1300. From 1837 to 1839 the building was renewed. In the late 19th century, the property was in private hands and was once more widely rebuilt: The clock and bell were removed, on the south and north side new windows and a new roof were installed. The original clock tower was installed in 1541, in 1865 renewed and between 1964 and 1966 it was rebuilt as a distinctive clock tower.

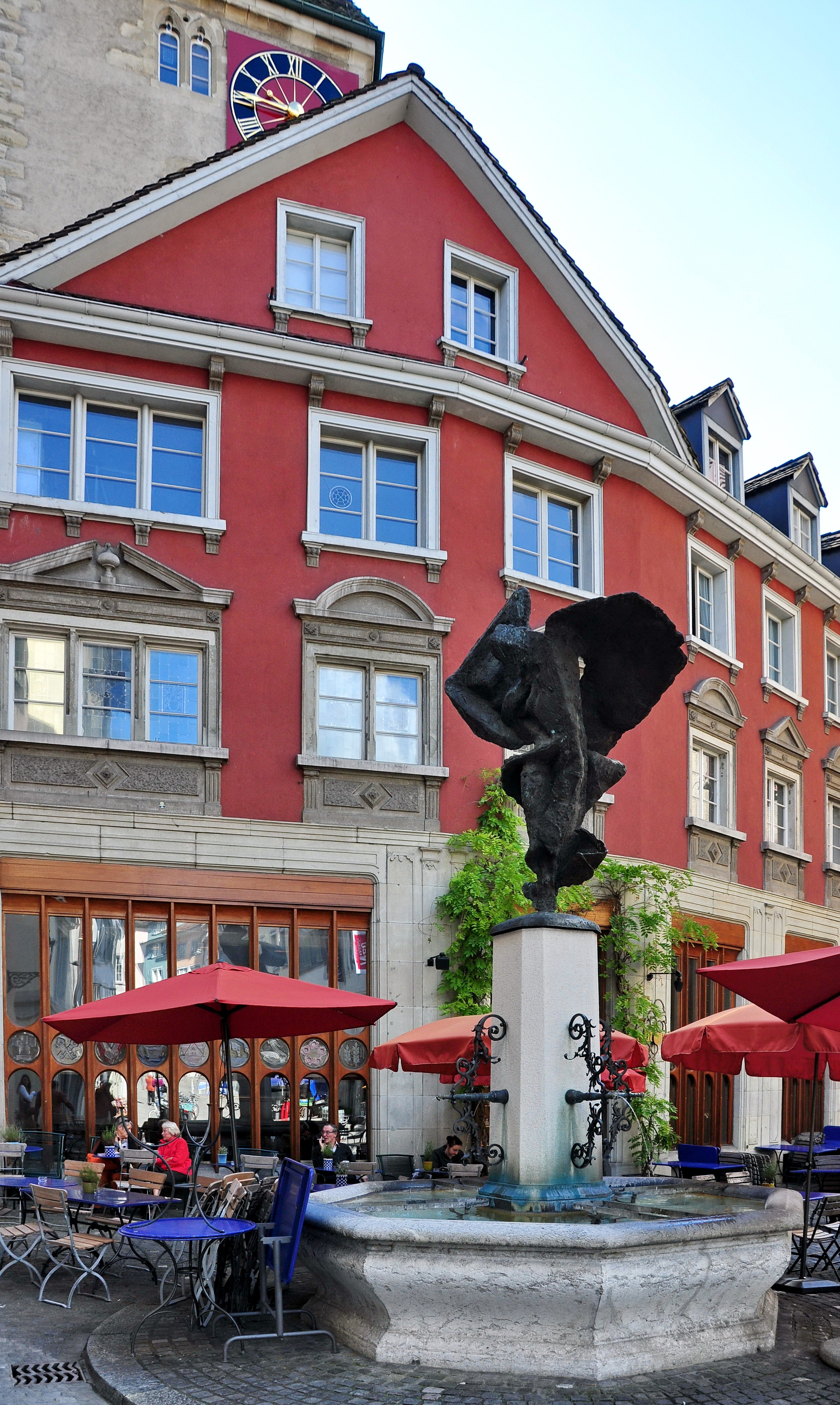
Zum Langen Keller, as of today serving as restaurant Neumarkt

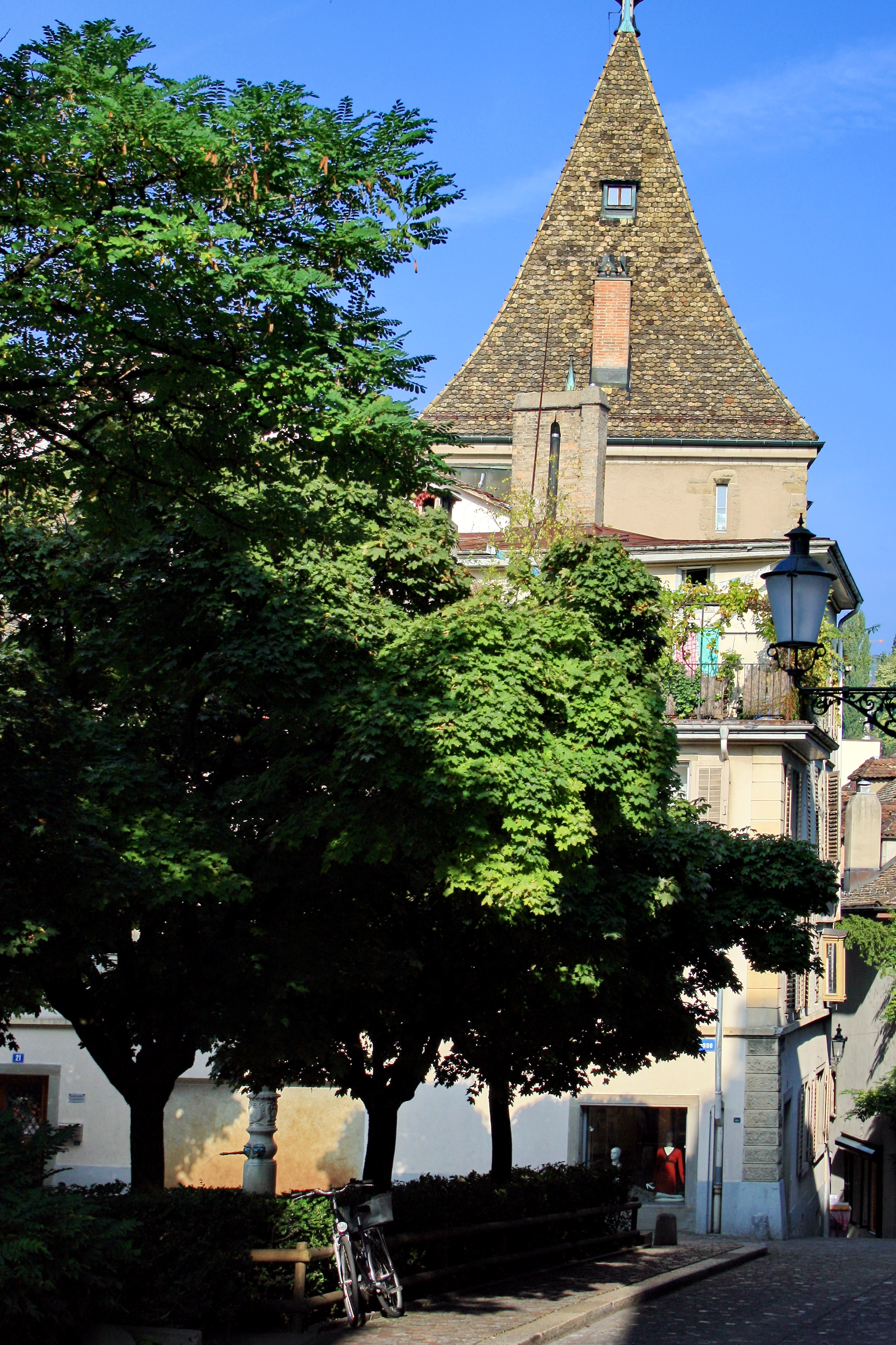
as seen from Spiegelgasse

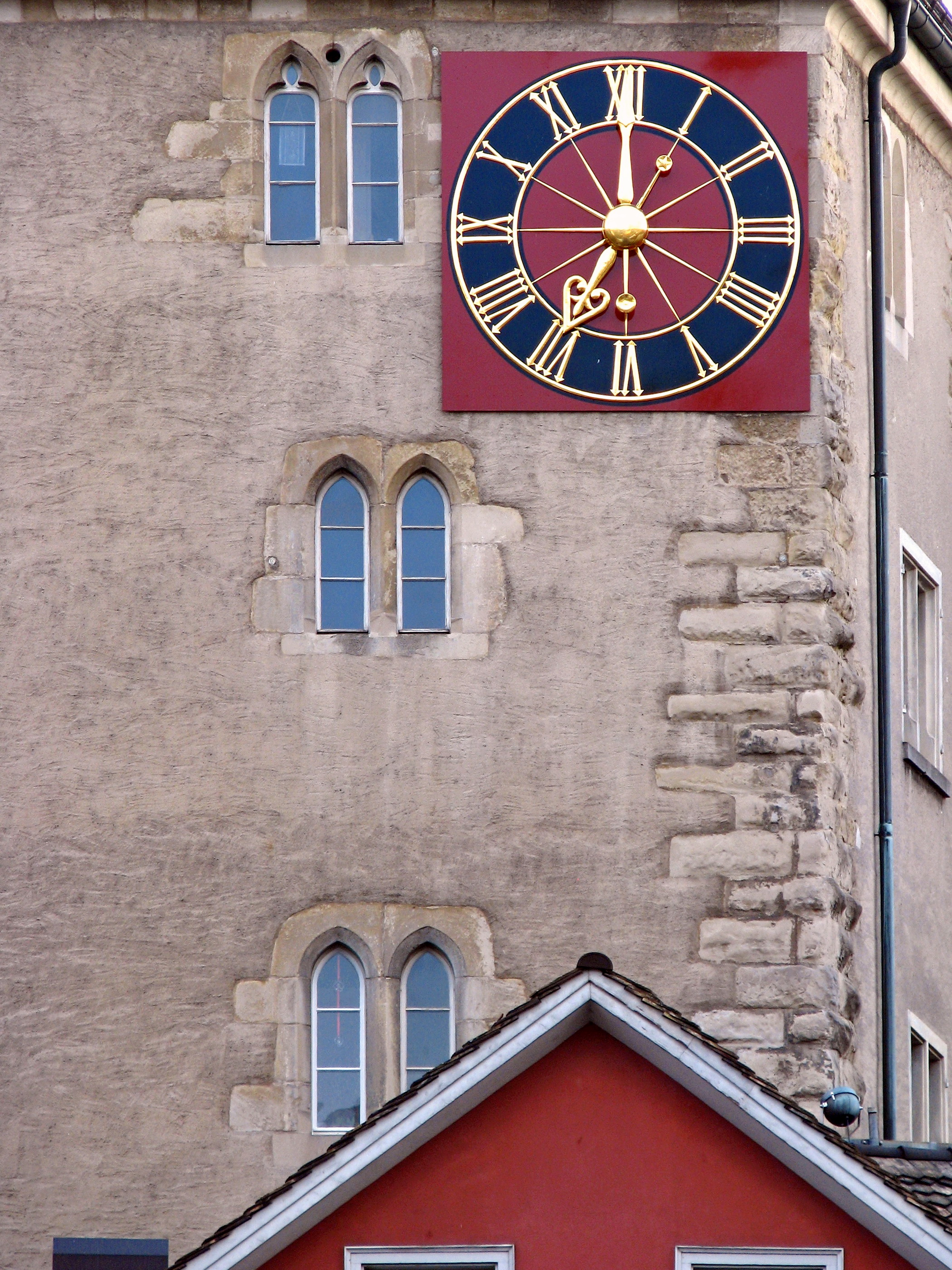
the clock face

== Cultural heritage ==
The building is listed in the Swiss inventory of cultural property of national and regional significance as a Class B object of regional importance.

== Literature ==
- Dölf Wild: Stadtmauern. Ein neues Bild der Stadtbefestigungen Zürichs (= Stadtgeschichte und Städtebau in Zürich. Schriften zu Archäologie, Denkmalpflege und Stadtplanung. 5). Schrift zur Ausstellung im Haus zum Haus zum Rech, Zürich, 6. Februar bis 30. April 2004. Amt für Städtebau, Baugeschichtliches Archiv, Zürich 2004, ISBN 3-905384-05-1.
