= Burgrecht =

A Burgrecht (ius burgense, ius civile) was a medieval agreement, most commonly in southern Germany and northern German-speaking Switzerland. It came to refer to an agreement between a town and surrounding settlements or to include the specific rights held by a city or town.

The word Burgrecht is first used by the St. Gall monk Notker the German in about 1000 AD to refer to the Roman civil law. Later, in the southern German region, it came to refer to inheritance laws and the rights that were tied to specific castle or town. In the territory, that would become Switzerland, starting in the 13th century, the term Burgrecht began to expand. It grew to mean any agreement between a town with other towns, monasteries, individuals (especially nobles with domination and ownership rights), organizations or personal corporations covenants and agreements that include a citizenship clause. These agreements could be indefinite or limited and renewable. The oath of citizenship with which the Burgrecht was sealed gave this agreement special weight in comparison to other alliances. The Verburgrechteten (those covered by the Burgrecht agreement) were allowed to enjoy, often limited, citizenship privileges including military and court protection as well as market access. The town or city received additional influence outside its borough and better coverage of their markets. The distribution of duties and rights in Burgrecht treaties reflects the power relationship between the parties.
