= Sigi Feigel =

Swiss lawyer (1921–2004)

Sigi Feigel (17 May 1921 – 28 August 2004) was a Swiss attorney, President and Honorary President of the Israelitische Cultusgemeinde Zürich (ICZ), and notable for his campaigns against antisemitism and racism.

Sigi Feigel ca. early 2000s

== Life and work ==
Feigel was born in Zürich to Russian Jewish immigrants. He received his PhD in jurisprudence at the University of Zürich in 1949. From 1949 to 1977, he was the director of the textile factory inherited by his wife, Evi Heim. The firm was sold in 1977, and from 1983, Feigel worked as an attorney.

Feigel was President of the Israelitische Cultusgemeinde Zürich (ICZ), Switzerland's biggest Jewish Community, from 1972 till 1987, and then became its Honorary President. He founded the Stiftung gegen Rassismus und Antisemitismus ("foundation against racism and antisemitism") (GRA) in the 1980s. In the 1990s, he was instrumental in the development of the Swiss anti-racism legislation (1995), and involved as a moderating voice of reason in the debate surrounding the role of Switzerland during the World Wars in the context of the World Jewish Congress lawsuit against Swiss Banks.

He received several decorations, including an honorary doctorate of the University of Zürich, in 1998. Sigi Feigel was buried in Zürich's Israelitischer Friedhof Oberer Friesenberg. In 2006, the city of Zürich named a terrasse at the Sihl river after him, the "Sigi-Feigel-Terrasse" (47.3759°N 8.5352°E).

== Literature ==
- Gisler, Andreas, "Die Juden sind unser Unglück", Briefe an Sigi Feigel 1997-98, Zürich (1999): collection of letters to Feigel in the context of the "Switzerland during WWII" controversy
- Obermüller, Klara, "Schweizer auf Bewährung", Gespräche mit Sigi Feigel
- Stutz, Hans (ed.), GRA reports on racist incidents in Switzerland, Zürich 2001-2007
- Braunschweig, Ernst (ed.), Antisemitismus - Umgang mit einer Herausforderung: Festschrift zum 70. Geburtstag von Sigi Feigel, Zürich (1991), ISBN 3-906561-24-0
