= History of the Jews in Zürich =

The history of the Jews in Zurich dates back to at least the Middle Ages. Since the early 20th century, Zurich, Switzerland, has been among the Swiss cities where Judaism is most prevalent, alongside Basel and Geneva.

== The Middle Ages ==
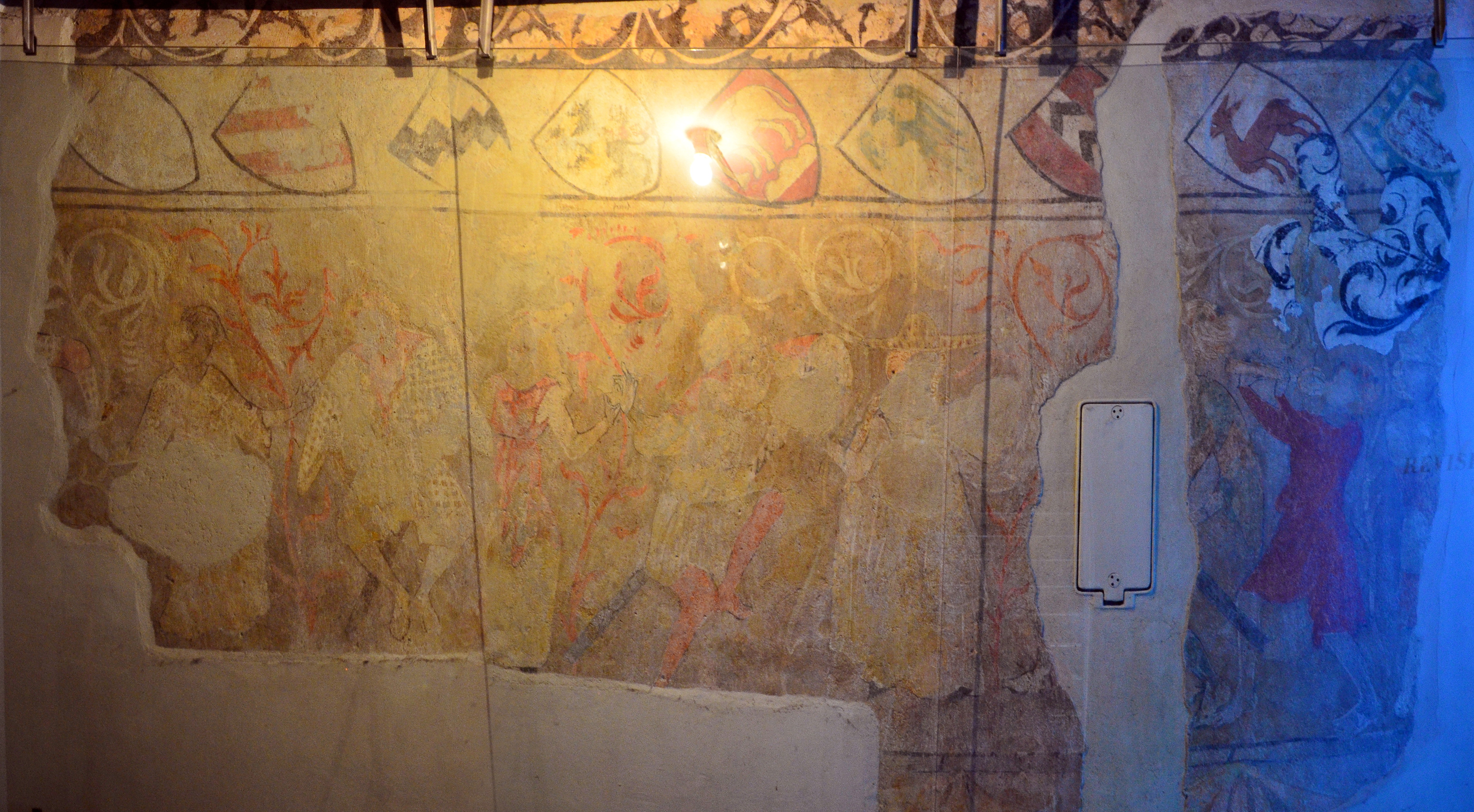
Armorial fresco, house "Zum Brunnenhof" (c. 1330)

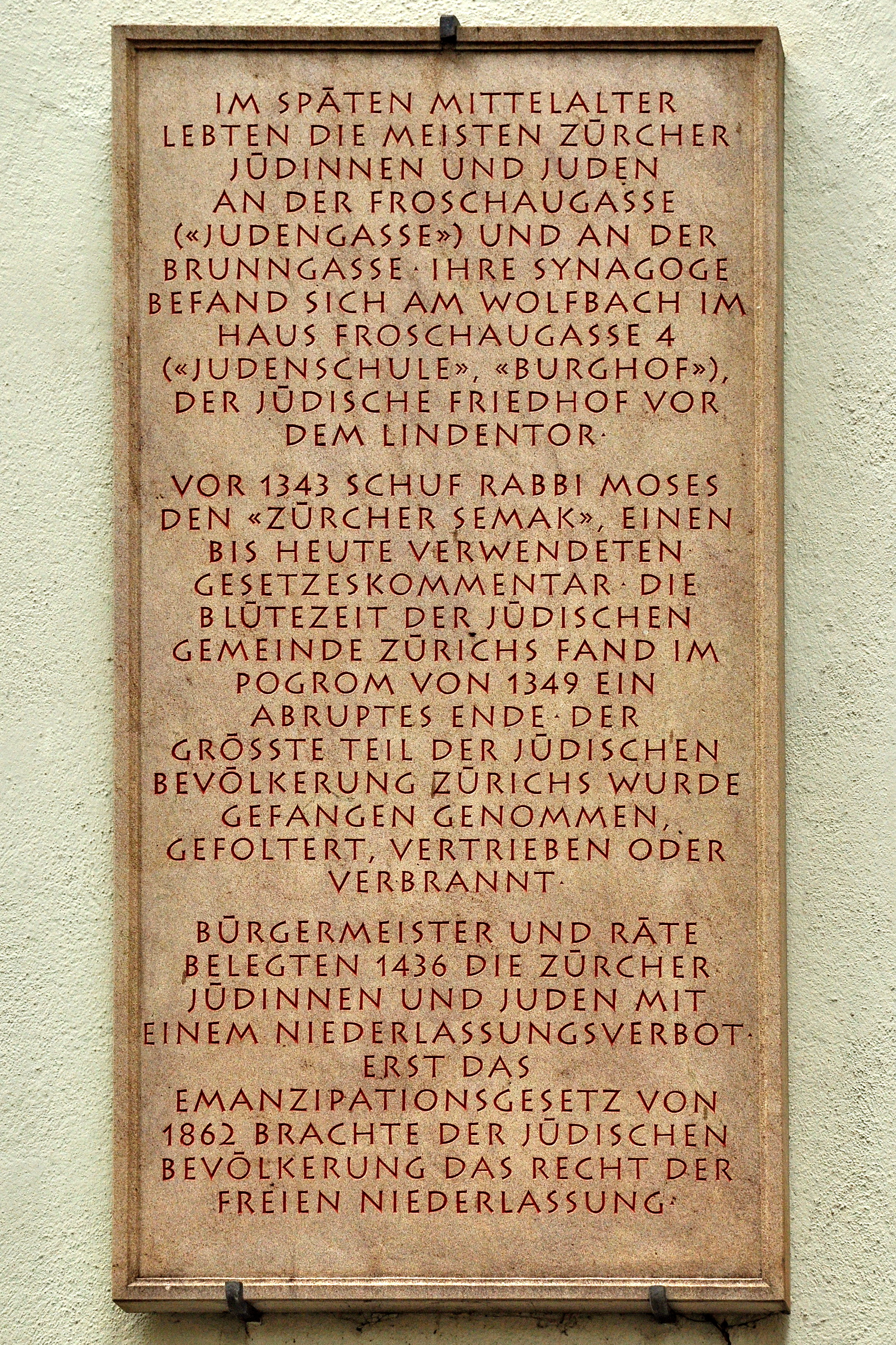
Commemorative plaque in the Froschaugasse, summarizing the history of the Jews in Zurich

Zurich's Jewish community was first mentioned in writing in 1234 and lived largely without incident amidst the city population. In the 14th century, the presence of a synagogue was recorded in Zurich near Froschaugasse, commemorated by today's Synagogen Gasse. At the time, Froschaugasse was known as Judengasse. The neighboring property Brunngasse 8 (Zum Brunnenhof) is home to significant wall paintings stylistically dated to around 1330, including coats of arms with Hebrew descriptions, which were re-discovered in 1996. The medieval inhabitants of the house, which probably also served as a meeting place for the Jewish community, were likely to be influential citizens: probably the brothers Moses and Gumprecht ben Menachem and their mother, Minne. The wall paintings were open to the public as a museum, the "Schauplatz Brungasse". Moses ben Menachem was a Hebrew scholar who wrote the Zurich Semak, a Hebrew commentary on the Sefer mitzvot Katan (small book of commandments) by Isaak ben Joseph of Corbeil. It remains the most influential work of Hebrew scholarship written in Switzerland to this day.

In response to the rise of the Black Death in 1349, Zurich, like most other Swiss cities, persecuted and burned local Jews (see Zurich Massacre), distributing their property among Zurich's non-Jews, with mayor Rudolf Brun securing a hefty share. The synagogue was destroyed. Sources indicate that the ben Menachem brothers and their mother Minne, living in Brunngasse 8, were also murdered.

Not long after, in 1354, Jews resettled in Zurich, with this second Jewish community's numbers rising to around 100 people (around 2% of the city population) towards the end of the century. At the turn of the century, the legal and economic positions of Jews in Zurich declined. From 1404, Jews were legally excluded from testifying against Christians in court, and in 1423 they were indefinitely expelled from the city.

== 17th and 18th centuries ==
In 1633, records indicate that the city of Rheineck actively supported the persecution and expulsion of its Jewish population, whose numbers had increased after being displaced from other areas. By 1634, Jews were officially banned from entering the city. On April 24, 1634, Samuel Eiron, a Jewish man from Lengnau, was executed for alleged blasphemy. Following this event, the mayor and city council of Zurich issued an order requiring all subordinate officials (Landvögte) to expel Jews from their jurisdictions. This directive also extended to the Grafschaft of Baden. However, approximately 20 Jewish households were permitted to remain there after Landvogt Alphons Sonnenberg of Lucerne reminded Zurich’s council that his authority allowed him to provide sanctuary to his subjects.

In 1787, under the protection of Castell-Remlingen, Jewish optician Samson Henlein and his partner Nehemias Kallmann were permitted to spend eight days in Zurich to trade optical instruments and practice their crafts.

== 19th century ==
Over the course of the 19th century, the situation of Jews in Zurich became increasingly fraught. The French government was advocating for the recognition of the rights of their Jewish citizens living in Switzerland, where they were subjected to numerous forms of discrimination. Towards the beginning of the 19th century, a few Alsacian Jews and a Jew from Endingen, Switzerland was able to settle in Zurich. Their numbers grew over the course of the century, with further influx after 1848 from Endingen and Lengnau, and later from Eastern Europe. A small Jewish community emerged, counting 100 people in 1862. That year, following the declaration of the full legal and political equality of Jews in the canton of Zurich, the Israelitischer Kultusverein was founded, later renamed Israelitische Cultusgemeinde.

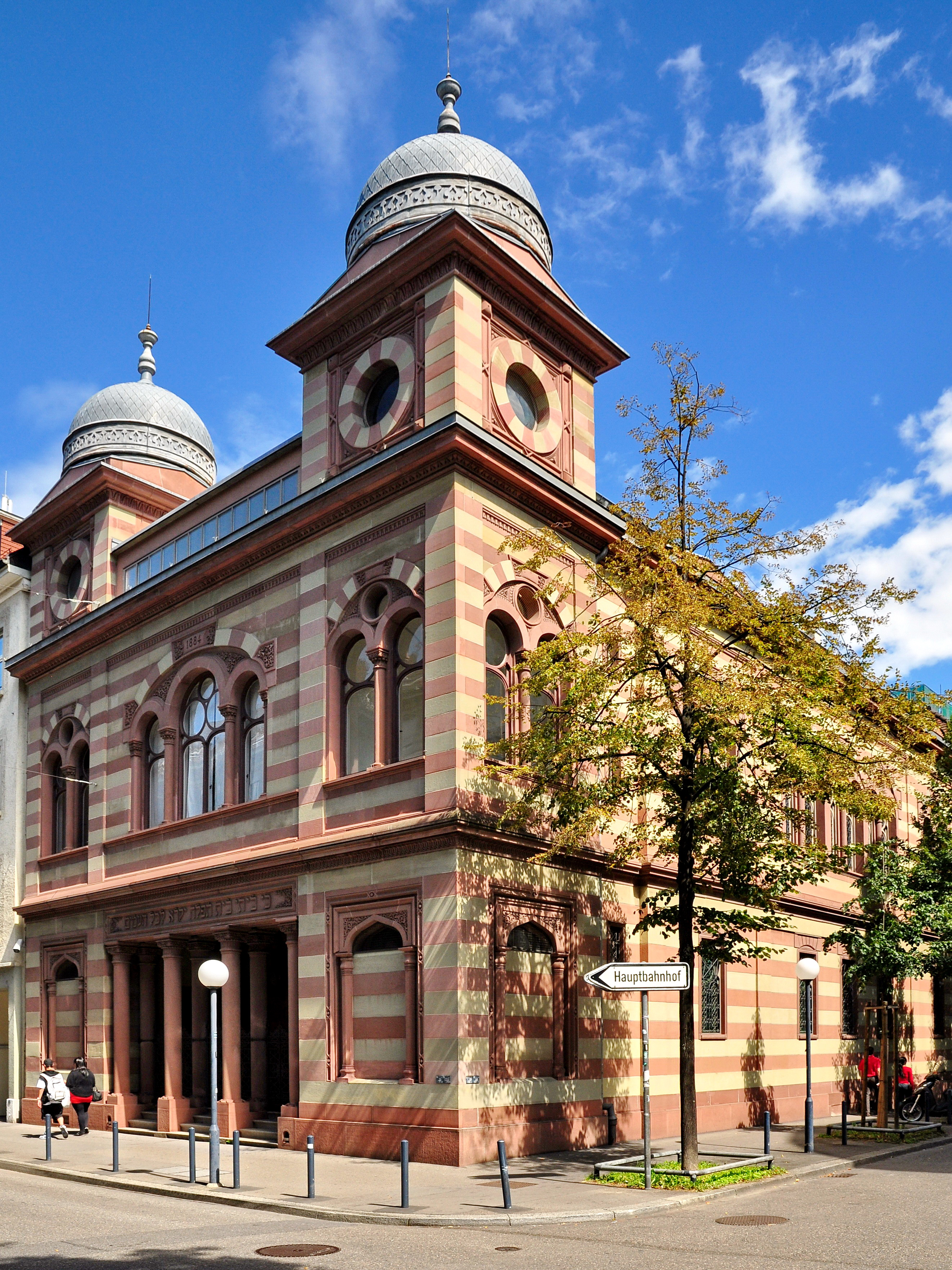
Synagoge Zürich Löwenstrasse, built in 1884

Two years later, the university had a Jewish dean, Max Büdinger, and from 1883 onwards, there was once again a synagogue in Zurich. With the referendum of 1866, Jews in Switzerland were granted freedom of settlement and the full exercise of civil rights, but these rights were not implemented in the Swiss federal constitution until 1874. After the Jews of Switzerland were emancipated in 1866, Jews had the freedom to leave the towns of Endingen and Lengnau, which are approximately 30-35 kilometers from Zurich. For almost 100 years, Swiss Jews were confined to these neighbouring communities. Zurich became one of the top choices for Jews who wanted to start over in a nearby urban area.

In 1895, Orthodox Jews founded the Israelitische Religionsgesellschaft Zürich. It is one of two Hareidi communities there. The second is Agudas Achim (Zurich), founded in 1927. Agudas Achim ("Association of Brothers") was founded in Zurich at the beginning of the 20th century due to the immigration of Jews from Eastern Europe (Poland, Baltic States, and Russia) who were fleeing the pogroms there. The community is still strongly influenced by Polish Hasidism.

== 20th century onwards ==
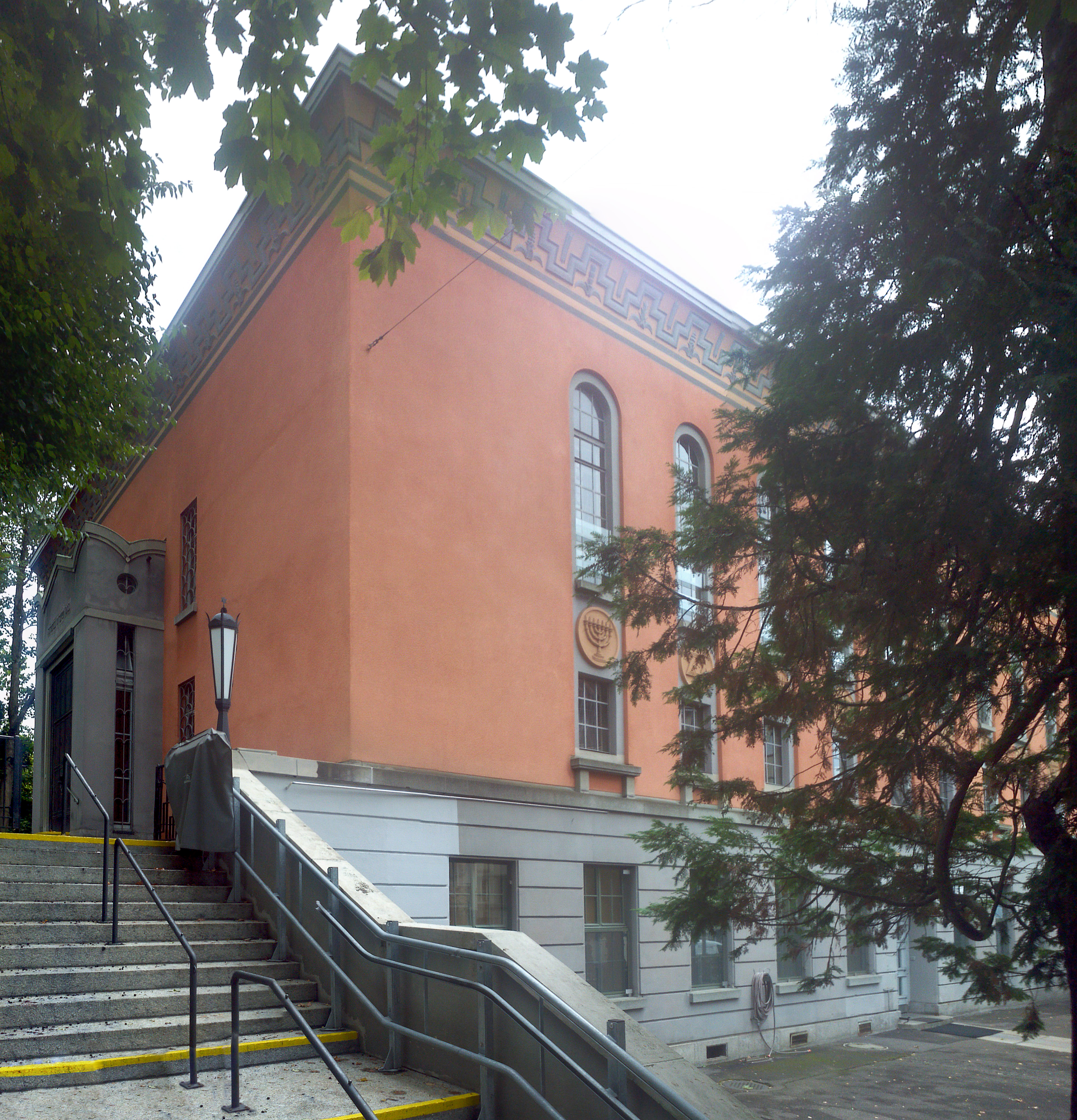
Synagogue of the Israelitische Religionsgesellschaft Zürich (IRGZ), inaugurated in 1924

Starting in 1920, the city of Zurich had special citizenship regulations that discriminated against Jews from Eastern Europe. These rules were dropped in 1936. In 1920, the proportion of the Jewish population was 1.3%. The Jews who came to Zurich in the first quarter of the 20th century were often self-employed, working as clothing and linen manufacturers, lawyers, doctors, or tradesmen.

In 1924, a local synagogue was vandalised with a number of swastikas engraved on the walls.

During World War II, most of the Jews who had fled to Switzerland came to Zurich and were granted the right of residence there from 1940 to 1943. With many Jews seeking refuge in Switzerland, funds were raised, not by Swiss authorities, but by the SIG (Israelite Community of Switzerland). The central committee for refugee aid, created in 1933, was located in Zurich. As Switzerland was a neutral zone, 1929 and 1937 saw Zurich host the World Zionist Congress, the first of which took place in 1897 in Basel, organized by the journalist Theodor Herzl.

In 1945, Zurich's Jewish population numbered about 10,500, but it declined again from 1948 onward. Since 1970, the Jewish population in Zurich has remained more or less constant at around one percent. The library of the Jewish Community of Zurich, which was opened in 1939, was declared a Swiss National Cultural Property in 2009, as it is considered the most important Judaica library in the German-speaking world.

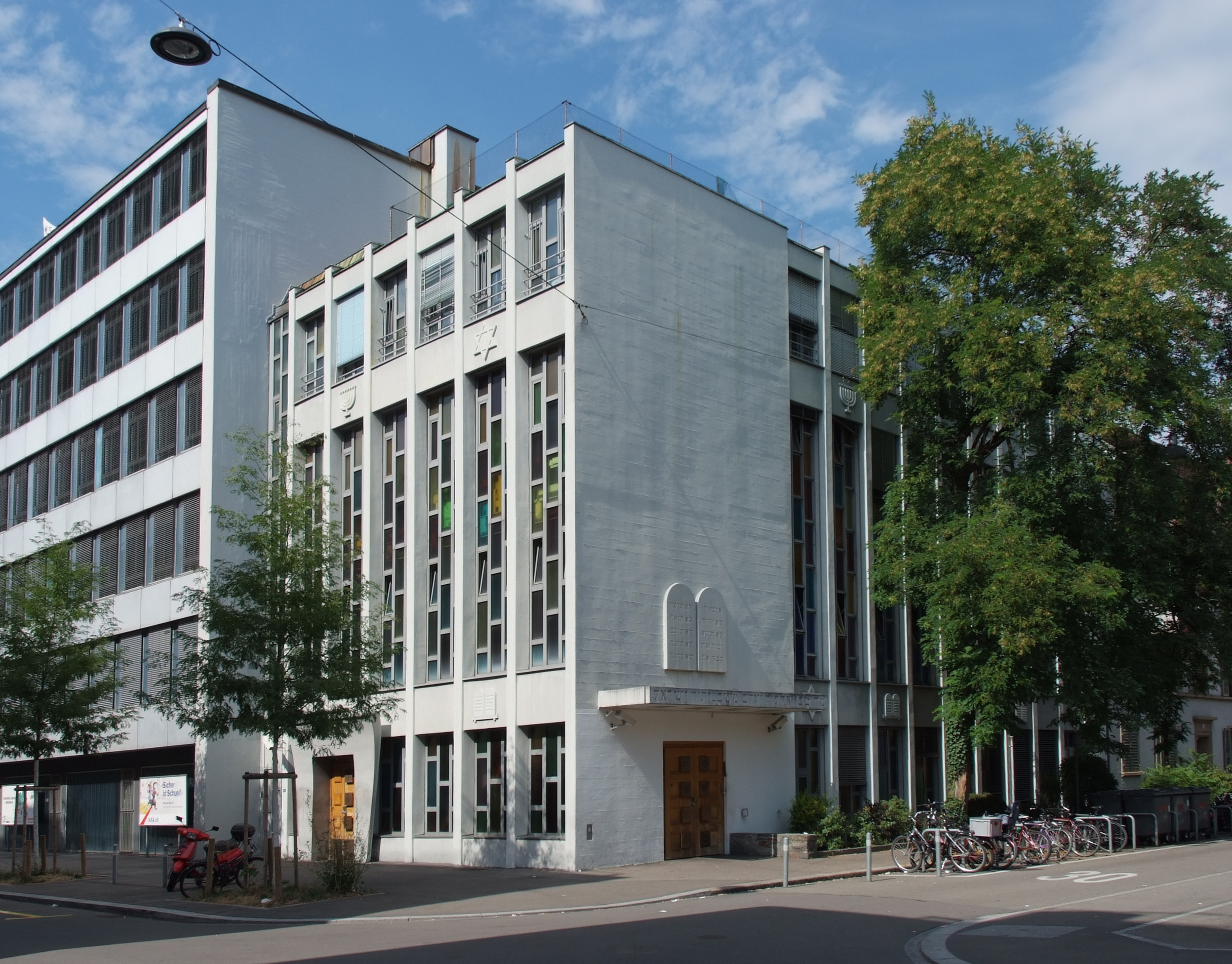
Agudas Achim Synagogue, completed in 1960

In 2005, Zurich had four Jewish congregations – the moderately Orthodox Israelitische Cultusgemeinde (ICZ); the Orthodox Israelitische Religionsgesellschaft (IRG); Agudas Achim (275 families and singles), which follows the East European tradition; and the egalitarian Liberal Jewish congregation Or Chadasch (est. in 1978) – each possessing its own religious institutions (e.g. four different Jewish cemeteries) and officials. The canton of Zurich did not recognize the Jewish religious communities as legal entities (and therefore as equal to national churches) until 2005. The Jewish liberal community of Zurich, Or Chadasch, was founded in 1978 and recognized by the state in 2007. At the end of 2020, the first seven Stolpersteine were laid in Zurich to commemorate victims of the Nazi regime.

As of 2021, around 5000 Jews live in District 2 and District 3, with another thousand living in the rest of the city. The Jewish population consists mainly of Ashkenazim. Others include Misrachim and Sephardim.

Zurich is home to representatives of orthodox and ultra-orthodox Judaism, as well as liberal and secular Judaism.

In March 2024, a 50-year-old Orthodox Jewish man was stabbed and critically injured in Zurich. The attack was allegedly carried out by a 15-year-old Swiss national of Tunisian descent who had pledged allegiance to the Islamic State and called for a “battle against the Jews". Swiss President Viola Amherd expressed shock over the attack and emphasized that "antisemitism has no place in Switzerland".

== See also ==
- Synagoge Zürich Löwenstrasse
- Israelitische Cultusgemeinde Zürich (ICZ)
- Neumarkt, Zurich
- History of the Jews in Switzerland
