= Markus G. Dreyfus =

Jewish teacher (1812 - 1877)

Markus Getsch Dreyfus also Markus Götsch Dreifus(s), (18 November 1812 - 20 May 1877) was a Jewish teacher and publicist involved in the struggle for Jewish emancipation in Switzerland.

== Life ==
Markus G. Dreifus was born on 18 November 1812 in Endingen as the son of Getsch Marum Dreyfus. His maternal grandfather was Rabbi Abraham Ris. Following a traditional Jewish upbringing, he attended the Talmud College in Breisach at the age of fourteen. He continued his education at the Protestant teachers' seminary in Karlsruhe (today the Pädagogische Hochschule Karlsruhe). In 1831, after passing the teacher training examination in Aarau, he took over the position of Hebrew teacher at the newly founded Israelite primary school in Endingen. Alongside this, he continued his education at the cantonal school in Aarau, and in 1834, he was enrolled for a short time at the University of Basel. He was the first Swiss Jew to do so.

He soon decided to devote himself entirely to teaching. One summer, he taught at the Fellenberg Institute in Hofwil and then in Hagenthal in Alsace. Having been declared the first Jew eligible to become head teacher, he took that position at the newly organised Israelite school in Endingen. He continued this role for numerous years, with brief interruptions in 1843 and 1861, when he worked as a religion teacher for the Jewish community in Geneva, and as editor of the Winterthurer Landbote respectively. He then accepted a position in Frankfurt am Main, where he was commissioned by the banker Hahn to establish a Jewish agricultural school. Dreyfus returned to Switzerland in 1872, and worked as a religion teacher in Zurich until 1876.

== Impact ==
Dreyfus devoted his life to the education of Jewish youth in accordance with the times. In addition, he was active in the struggle for the emancipation of Jews in Switzerland. His pedagogy was based on the reform schools of the German-Jewish Enlightenment. The First Hebrew Reading Booklet, which he wrote, was published in several editions.

In 1839, Dreyfus founded the Poel tow craftsmen's association to support Jewish apprentices. This was shortly after Swiss restrictions for Jews were lifted in various professional fields. The attempt to establish an agricultural school in Endingen failed due to lack of funds. In addition to his work as a teacher, Dreyfus was also active as a journalist and maintained contact with influential representatives of liberal Judaism, such as Rabbi Ludwig Philippson, the pioneer of Reform Judaism Abraham Geiger and the historian Isaak Marcus Jost.

Between 1839 and 1866, Dreyfus wrote several petitions to the canton of Aargau and to the Swiss federal government concerning the civil equality of Jews. In 1860, he published Zur Würdigung des Judenthums unter seinen Nichtbekennern (On the Appreciation of Judaism among its Non-Confessors), in which he presented the principles of Judaism in dialogue form, countering popular attacks. Two years later, a proposed law for the emancipation of Jews in Switzerland was rejected, and the struggle continued until 1866 when a referendum finally brought the civil equality Dreyfus had fought for. In Aargau, some local restrictions on regional voting remained even until 1874.

== See also ==
- History of the Jews in Switzerland
