= List of synagogues in Switzerland =

This is a list of synagogues in Switzerland.

== Aargau canton ==
Name	Image	City	Affiliation	Rabbi	Notes
Synagogue of Baden		Baden	Orthodox		
Endingen Synagogue		Endingen			
Lengnau Synagogue		Lengnau			

== Basel-Stadt canton ==
Name	Image	City	Affiliation	Rabbi	Notes
Israelitische Gemeinde Basel (IGB)		Basel		Snyders, M.	
Israelitische Gesselchaft Basel (IRGB)		Basel		Lehmann, B.	

== Bern canton ==
Name	Image	City	Affiliation	Rabbi	Notes
Synagogue of Bern		Bern			
Biel Juedische Gemeinde		Biel/Bienne			
Nadvorna Beis Hamedrasch		Thun	Hasidic	Ackerman, P.	

== Fribourg canton ==
Name	Image	City	Affiliation	Rabbi	Notes
Synagogue of Fribourg		Fribourg			

== Geneva canton ==
Name	Image	City	Affiliation	Rabbi	Notes
Beth Yaakov Synagogue		Geneva			
Communauté Juive Libérale de Genève		Geneva	Reform	Nathan Alfred	
Hekhal Haness Synagogue		Geneva	Orthodox	Rav Mikhaël Benadmon	

== Grisons canton ==
Name	Image	City	Affiliation	Rabbi	Notes
Judische Gemeinde - Shalom Bonayich		Chur		Miyers, J.	
Davos Synagogue		Davos			

== Jura canton ==
Name	Image	City	Affiliation	Rabbi	Notes
Delémont Synagogue		Delémont			

== Neuchâtel canton ==
Name	Image	City	Affiliation	Rabbi	Notes
Synagogue of La Chaux-de-Fonds		La Chaux-de-Fonds			

== Nidwalden canton ==
Name	Image	City	Affiliation	Rabbi	Notes
Beth David Nidwaldner Synagoge		Nidwalden		Goldschmidt, S.	

== Schaffhausen canton ==
Name	Image	City	Affiliation	Rabbi	Notes
Shäerei Rahamim Synagoge		Schaffhausen		Foureshtepps, D.	

== St. Gallen canton ==
Name	Image	City	Affiliation	Rabbi	Notes
Ohr Hatorah		Wil		Letterer, T.	

== Vaud canton ==
Name	Image	City	Affiliation	Rabbi	Notes
Synagogue of Lausanne		Lausanne			

== Zurich canton ==
Name	Image	City	Affiliation	Rabbi	Notes
Agudas Achim		Zurich	Orthodox	Breisch, S.	
Altersheim Sikna		Zurich		Kotsker, L.	
Bels		Zurich	Hasidic		
Gurer Schtiebel		Zurich	Hasidic		
Hugo Mendelheim, Altersheim		Zurich		Hoffman, M.	
Israelitische Religionsgesellschaft Zürich (IRGZ)		Zurich	Orthodox	Levy, Ch. M.	
Machsike Hadass		Zurich	Orthodox	Schmerler, M.	
Minjan Brunau		Zurich		Lewis, L.	
Minjan Weststr		Zurich		Bollag, F.	
Minjan Wollishofen		Zurich			
Neuer Selnauer Synagoge		Zurich		Birnbaum, S.	
Or Chadasch Jüdische Liberale Gemeinde		Zurich	Liberal/Reform	Bar Ephraim, R.	
Sichroin Moische		Zurich	Satmar	Hochauser, M.	
Synagoge Zürich Löwenstrasse (ICZ congregation)		Zürich-City	Orthodox	Hertig, N.	

== See also ==
- List of synagogues
- History of the Jews in Switzerland
