= History of the Jews in Geneva =

The history of the Jews in Geneva dates back to at least the Middle Ages. Geneva is the only place in present day Switzerland where Jews had to live in a ghetto (around the year 1420). It was not until the 19th century that Jews were granted freedom of establishment, but numerous Jews were able to live in Carouge towards the end of the 18th century. Today, Geneva is one of the Swiss cities where Judaism is most prevalent (alongside Basel and Zürich) and is home to diverse Jewish communities and establishments.

== Middle Ages ==
There is evidence of Jewish settlement in Geneva towards the end of the 12th century, as Jews immigrated there from the upper Rhine valley and Savoy in France. Around 1300, Geneva had a synagogue, as did Lausanne.

Sources show that there were 13 Jewish families in Geneva around 1400. In the 1420s, the Jews were confined to living in a ghetto- the only one to exist in Switzerland. They were expelled towards the end of the century, after a decision by the city council in 1490, marking the end of the first Jewish community of Geneva.

Following this, only rare events document the passage of Jews in the area until the 19th century.

== 16th to 18th century ==
Jews travelling to Venice through Geneva had to pay transit fees, which were so rarely required that they first had to be determined. These proofs of Jewish travel can be seen in the customs documents of 16th century.

In 1632, the preacher Nicolas Antoine was burned for judaising (living according to Jewish customs).

Towards the end of the 18th century, following their expulsion from cities such as Berne, Freiburg and Neuenburg, numerous Jews found permanent settlement in Carouge, today a political municipality of Geneva. Their admission was in line with the Sardinian government's plans to elevate the small town of a few hundred inhabitants to a city and thus a rival to Protestant Geneva. As early as 1780, Carouge accepted Alsatian Jews and some from England, Germany, Hungary and Italy. Only select professional Jews were admitted. They had to prove their efficiency and commercial honesty. Among them were manufacturers such as Joseph Abraham from London, who produced watch glasses, or Joseph Vigevano from Livorno, a producer of sealing wax.

On 27 August 1787, Victor-Amédée III proclaimed an edict of tolerance, allowing the Jews to benefit from the application of common law and to enjoy total freedom of worship, a rare case in the history of Europe. The Freemasons had their lodge, the Protestants their temple and the Jews their synagogue, as well as a denominational cemetery (the Jewish cemetery of Carouge) located along the present Passage des Tireurs de Sable. In 1798, there were 75 Jews living in Carouge.

That year, Geneva was annexed by France. The French laws of liberty, equality and fraternity also applied to Jews. This changed when the annexation ended in 1814.

== 19th and 20th century ==
From the beginning of the 19th century, more and more Jewish communities formed in the area, including in Avenches, La Chaux-de-Fonds, Yverdon, Lausanne and Porrentruy.

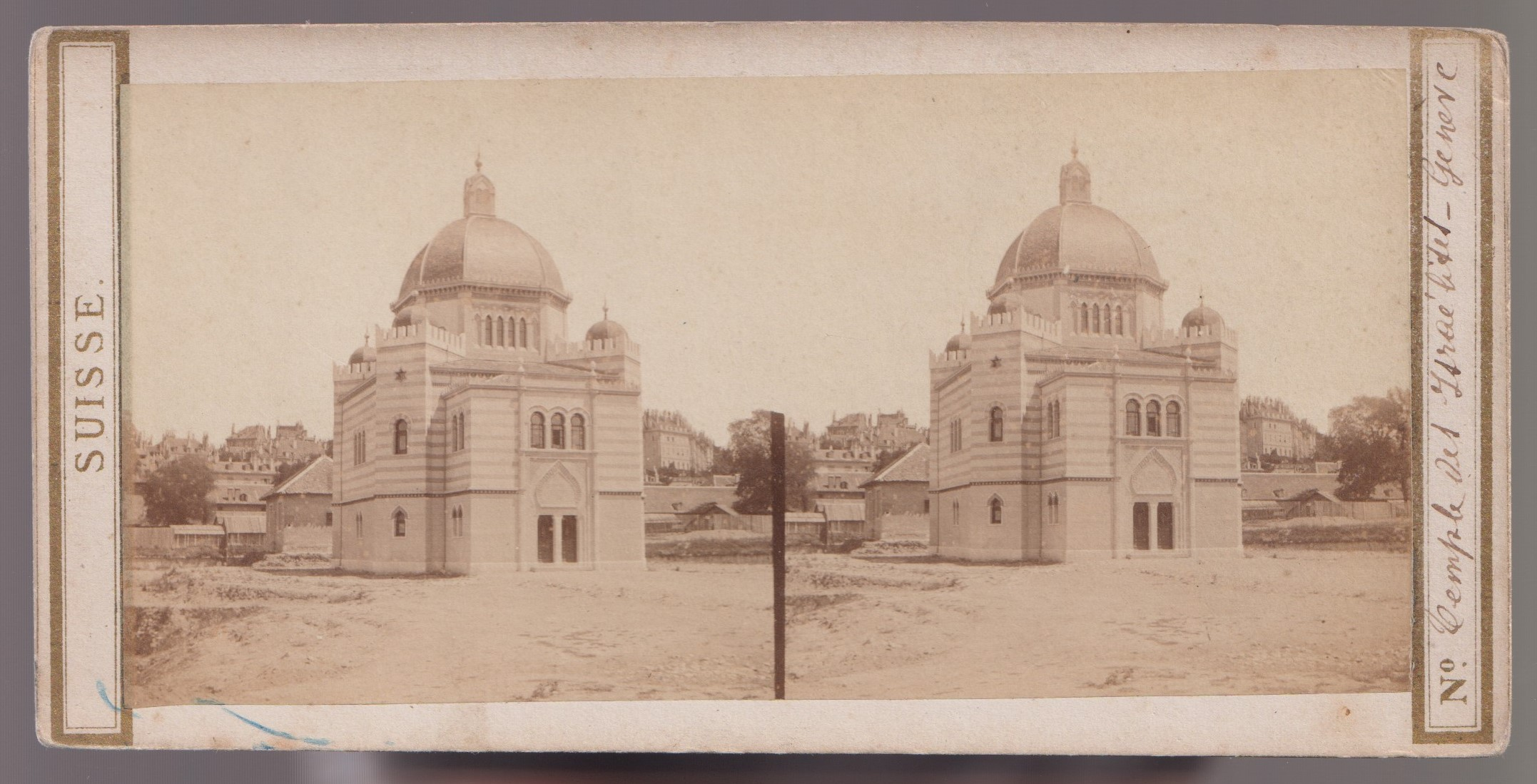
Cardboard stereoscopic disc with photos of the synagogue in Geneva, circa. 1860, in the collection of the Jewish Museum of Switzerland.

In 1841, Jews were granted freedom of establishment in the canton of Geneva. Shortly after, in 1852, the Communauté Israélite de Genève was founded (CIG). From 1856 there was once again a Jewish cemetery and synagogue in Geneva.

With 55% of the Jewish population of Switzerland divided between Zürich, Basel and Geneva in 1910, urban Judaism became dominant. In the previous centuries, with a few exceptions in the Romandy, Swiss Jews only had a (temporary) right of residence in the Surbtal villages Endingen and Lengnau.

The years 1920 to 1930 were marked by increasing anti-Semitic sentiment in Geneva. During the war, the city was popular with smugglers thanks to its proximity to the border, and many Jewish refugees were brought into Switzerland. However, all too often, these refugees were found and sent back, condemning them to certain death.

After fleeing Nazi- Germany in the autumn of 1933, Hannah Arendt worked for a short time at the League of Nations in Geneva. She helped issue entry visas for Jewish settlers and wrote speeches for the Jewish Agency for Palestine.

In 1936, the World Jewish Congress was founded in Geneva as a political platform to show solidarity with the persecuted Jews in Nazi Germany, to combat anti-Semitism in Europe and the oppression of Jews in the Soviet Union and to promote the political necessity of a Jewish social and migration policy.

As Switzerland was a neutral zone, 1939 saw Geneva host the twenty-first World Zionist Congress, first held in Basel in 1897.

Towards the end of the 19th century, Judaism in Geneva underwent a period of change. The first generation of Alsatian Jews was joined by Ashkenazi immigrants evading precarious socio-economic and political conditions in Eastern Europe and Russia. Another group came from the Ottoman Empire. In 1916, the nucleus of a Sepharad brotherhood, the "Groupe Fraternel Séfaradi" was formed. After the Second World War other Sephardic Jews came from the Middle East and, after decolonization, from North African countries.

After the incorporation of the group of Sephardic Jews into the Communauté Israélite de Genève in 1965, which comprised 580 families as of 2009, all the main religious trends were united in the community. Only the small orthodox congregation Mahsike Hadass (which followed the congregation Agudath Achim, founded in 1918 by Hungarian Jews) continues to exist independently. Since 1970, the community has become increasingly diverse. The Liberal Israelite Group was founded in 1970, and at the end of the 1980s, the community Beth Chabad, based on the Chabad Lubavitch movement. This plurality is characterized by no less than seven synagogues and prayer rooms in Geneva today. The city is home to two Jewish kindergartens, two Jewish schools (Girsa and Chabad) and a Jewish home for the elderly (Les Marroniers).
