= Hekhal Haness Synagogue =

Orthodox synagogue in Geneva, Switzerland

- Hebrew: בית הכנסת היכל הנס
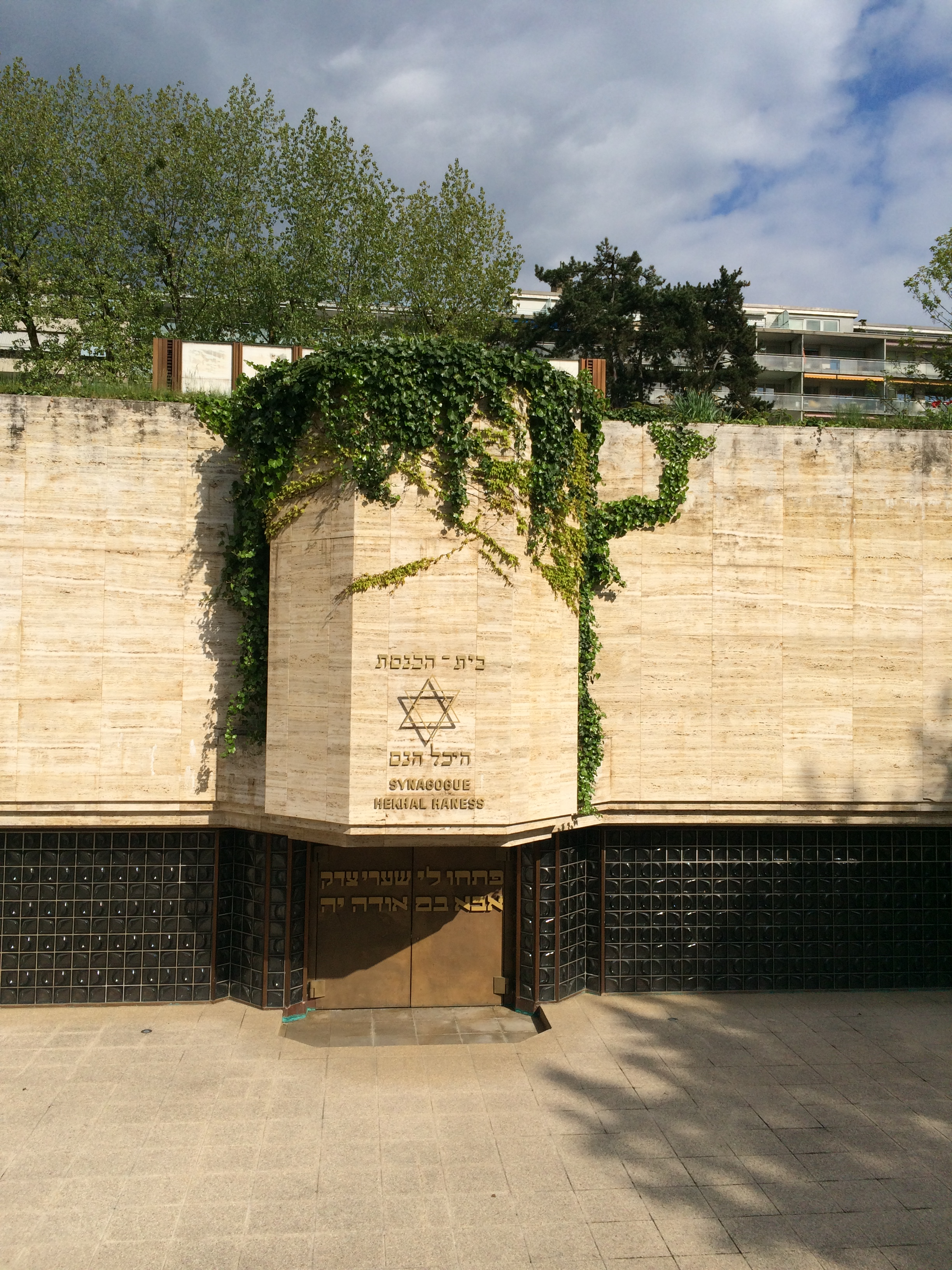
- The synagogue in 2015

- Location of the synagogue in the Canton of Geneva

Religion
- Affiliation: Orthodox Judaism
- Rite: Sephardi
- Ecclesiastical or organisational status: Synagogue
- Ownership: Communauté Israélite de Genève
- Status: Active

Location
- Location: Route de Malagnou 54TER, 1208 Geneva, Canton of Geneva
- Country: Switzerland
- Coordinates: 46°11′47″N 6°09′52″E

Architecture
- Architects: René Favre; Gabriel de Freudenreich; Antoine Guth; Marc Tzala
- Type: Synagogue architecture
- Style: Modernist
- Funded by: Nessim Gaon
- Groundbreaking: 1970
- Completed: 1972

Specifications
- Capacity: 1,200 worshipers
- Materials: Concrete

Website
- hekhalhaness.ch (in French)

The Hekhal Haness Synagogue (Hebrew: בית הכנסת היכל הנס) is an Orthodox Jewish congregation and synagogue, located in Geneva, in the Canton of Geneva, Switzerland. The largest synagogue in Geneva, the synagogue was severely damaged by a fire on May 24, 2007, attributed to arson.

The synagogue was funded by Nessim Gaon, a Swiss businessman.

== See also ==
- History of the Jews in Switzerland
- List of synagogues in Switzerland
