= Alfred Donath =

Swiss pediatrician and nuclear medicine specialist

- Born: May 23, 1932; Basel, Switzerland
- Died: June 28, 2010 (aged 78); Geneva, Switzerland
- Resting place: Jewish cemetery of Veyrier
- Occupations: Pediatrician, nuclear medicine specialist

Alfred Donath (May 23, 1932 in Basel – June 28, 2010 in Geneva) was a Swiss pediatrician and nuclear medicine specialist known for his tenure as president of the Swiss Federation of Jewish Communities. from 2000 to 2008 and vice president of the EJC from 2007 to 2008.

During his tenure as president of the Swiss Federation of Jewish Communities, he attempted to have the ban on shechita (Jewish ritual slaughter) in Switzerland lifted, but refrained from these plans when signs of antisemitism intensifying as a result became apparent. He also played a leading role in the establishment of a Jewish community in Switzerland. Donath was the federation's vice president when Swiss banks in 1998 reached an out-of-court settlement to pay Holocaust victims and their heirs $1.25 billion. He was also President of the Chabad Community in Geneva.

He was also instrumental in exposing the embezzlement of World Jewish Congress funds committed by Israel Singer.

Donath died at the age of 78 on June 28, 2010. World Jewish Congress President Ronald S. Lauder praised Donath as one of the great figures of Swiss Jewry:

“Alfred Donath always fought hard to defend the Swiss community against all kinds of attacks. At the same time, Alfred Donath was always fair and sought to heal divisions and he leaves a great legacy, notably in the field of inter-faith dialogue, where he achieved good progress. A vice-president of the European Jewish Congress and a regular participants at WJC meetings, he also was a friend and defender of Israel, and he will be sorely missed by the WJC family.”

He left behind a widow, five children and ten grandchildren. He is buried in the Jewish cemetery of Veyrier near Geneva.
