= Beth Yaakov Synagogue =

Synagogue in Geneva, Switzerland

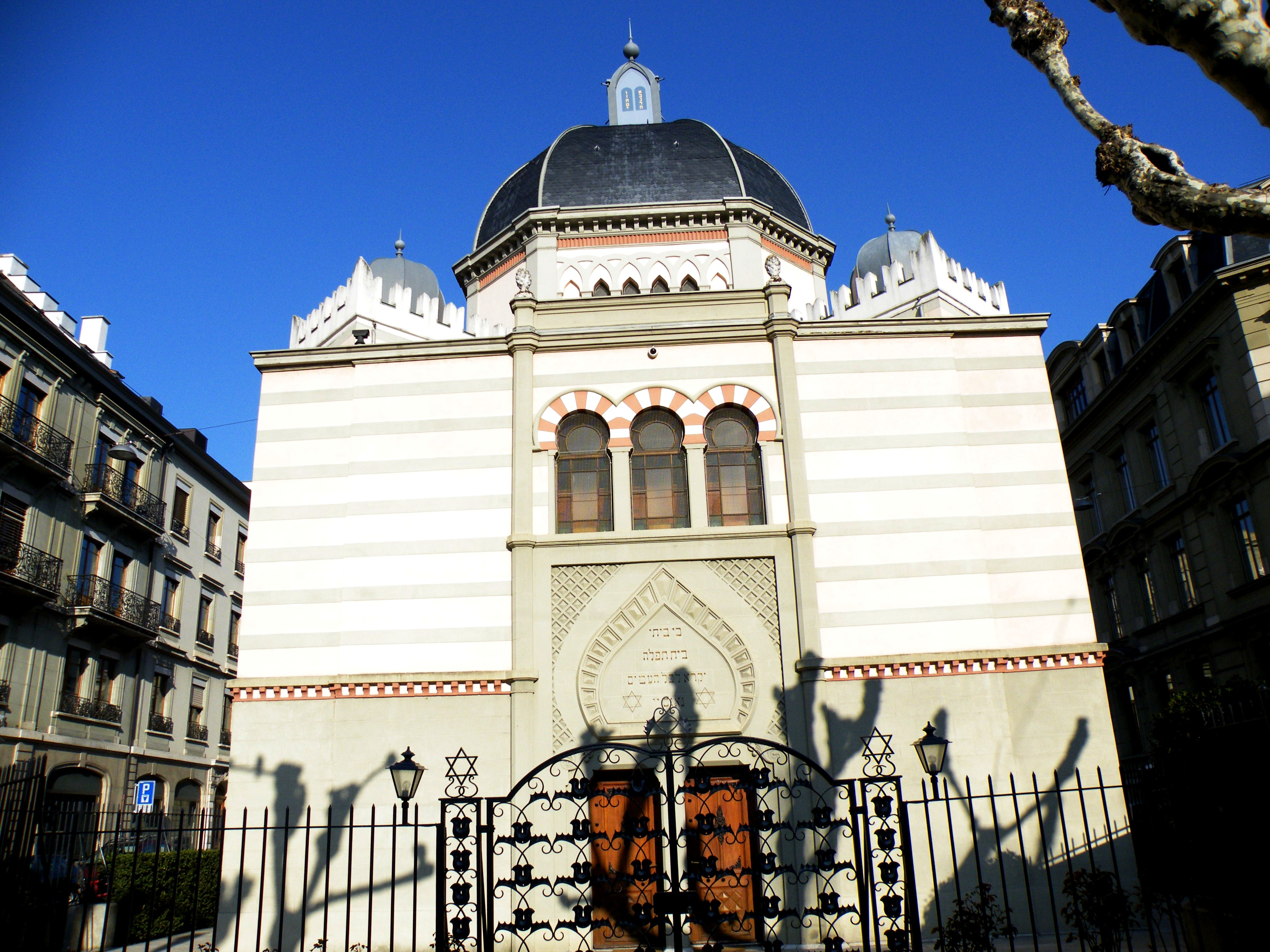
- The Grande Synagogue in 2011

- Location of the synagogue in the Canton of Geneva

Religion
- Affiliation: Judaism
- Rite: Nusach Ashkenaz
- Ecclesiastical or organizational status: Synagogue
- Ownership: Communauté Israélite de Genève
- Leadership: Rabbi Jacob Tolédano
- Status: Active

Location
- Location: 11 Place de la Synagogue, Geneva, Canton of Geneva
- Country: Switzerland
- Interactive map of Beth Yaakov Synagogue
- Coordinates: 46°12′10″N 6°08′27″E

Architecture
- Architect: Jean-Henri Bachofen
- Type: Synagogue architecture
- Style: Moorish Revival; Byzantine Revival
- Established: c. 1857 (as a congregation)
- Groundbreaking: 1857
- Completed: 1859

Specifications
- Dome: One
- Materials: Brick

The Beth Yaakov Synagogue, also the Great Synagogue or the Grande Synagogue, is a Jewish congregation and synagogue, located at 11 Place de la Synagogue, Geneva, in the Canton of Geneva, Switzerland. Located in the heart of Geneva, the synagogue was completed in 1859 for the Ashkenazi Jewish community, which comprised about 200 people at the time of the synagogue's construction.

== Architecture ==
Designed by the Swiss architect, Jean Henri Bachofen, the synagogue is a mix of Moorish Revival and Byzantine Revival architectural styles. At the entrance one can see Moorish style arches. The bimah, for reading of the Torah, is located in front of the Torah ark, opposite the main entrance. This style was adopted later in the history of world synagogues, since the bimah was usually built in the middle of the congregation. Women have their own sections on both sides of the prayer hall. The building has been registered as a Swiss historic monument because of its architecture.

== Gallery ==
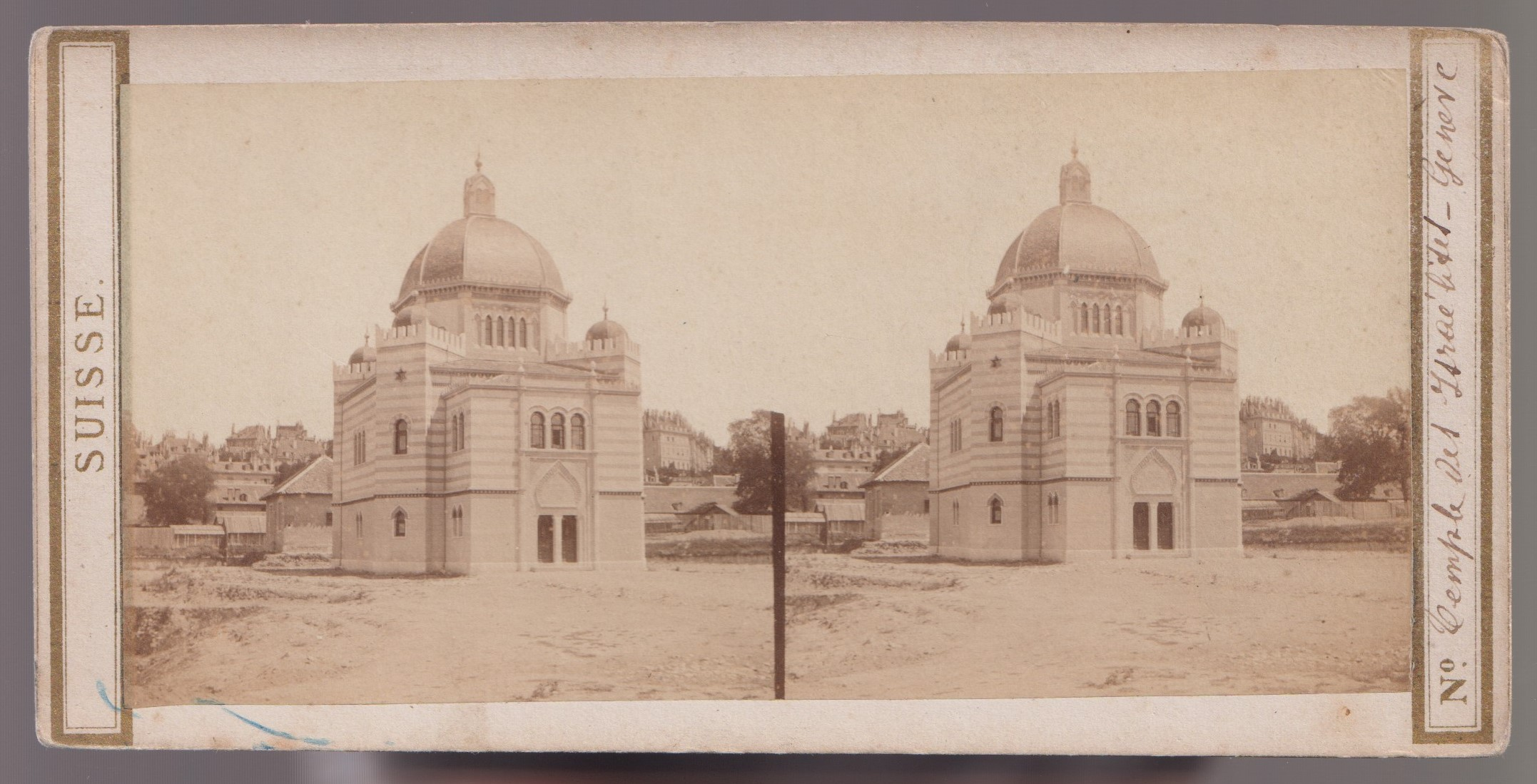
Cardboard stereoscopic disc with photos of the synagogue in Geneva, c. 1860, in the collection of the Jewish Museum of Switzerland

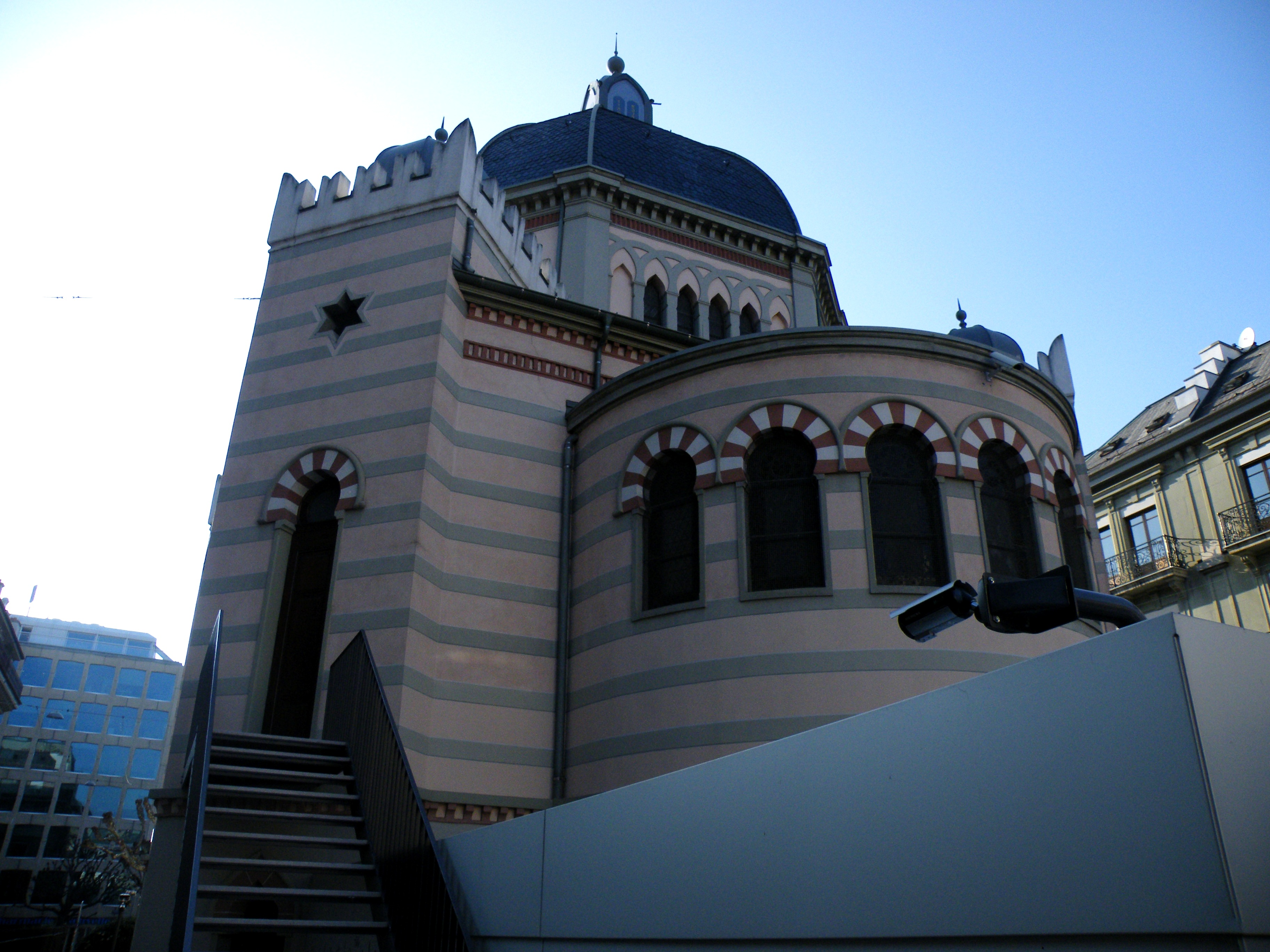
Rabbi's entrance

== See also ==
- History of the Jews in Switzerland
- List of synagogues in Switzerland
- Plainpalais
