= Liberal Jewish Community of Geneva =

Jewish community in Geneva, Switzerland

Communauté Juive Libérale de Genève
Regions with significant populations
- Geneva, Switzerland

Religions
- Reform Judaism

Website
- gil.ch

Beith GIL
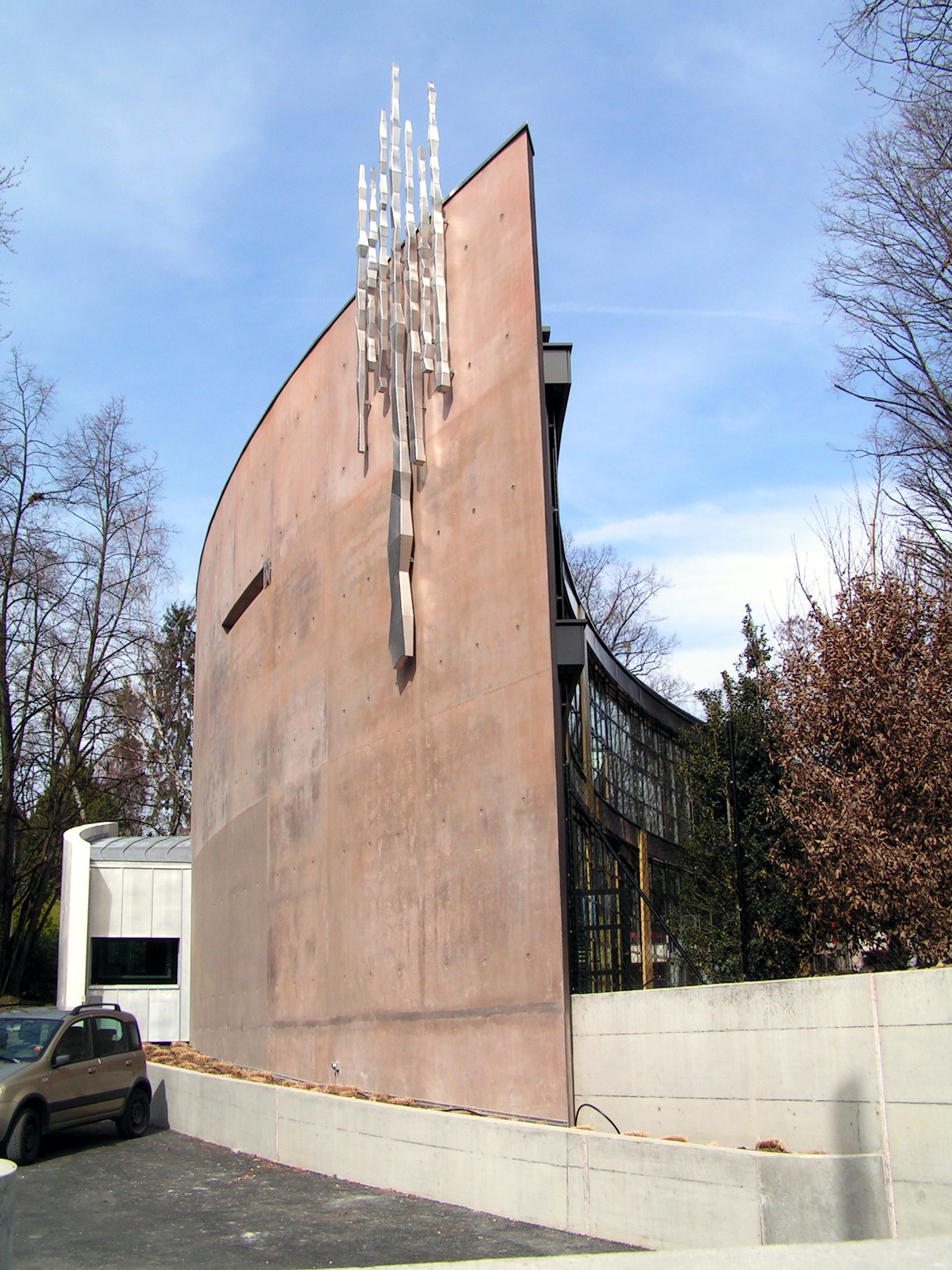
- The synagogue of the congregation, as seen from 43 route de Chêne - CH-1208 Geneva

- Location of the congregation's synagogue in the Canton of Geneva

Religion
- Affiliation: Reform Judaism
- Rite: Nusach Ashkenaz
- Ecclesiastical or organisational status: Synagogue
- Status: Active

Location
- Location: 43 Route de Chêne, Geneva
- Country: Switzerland
- Coordinates: 46°12′2.064″N 6°10′15.447″E

Architecture
- Architect: NOMOS Groupement d'Architectes SA
- Type: Synagogue architecture
- Style: Modernist
- Established: 1970 (as a congregation)
- Completed: 2010
- Materials: Concrete

The Liberal Jewish Community of Geneva (French: Communauté Juive Libérale de Genève), abbreviated as GIL, is a Reform Jewish community, whose synagogue is located on the eastern side of the River Rhone in Geneva, Switzerland. It is a member of the Platform of Liberal Jews Switzerland (World Union for Progressive Judaism) and the Federation for francophone progressive Judaism (Fédération du judaïsme libéral francophone).

== History ==
Established as the Liberal Israelite Group (French: Groupe Israélite Libéral) on 7 December 1970, the organisation was later renamed the Communauté Juive Libérale de Genève. Guided by its Rabbi François Garaï since 1969, a year before its formal inception, the community held services in a variety of settings including a private library, a rented room on rue Moillebeau, and then at quai du Seujet. Finally, GIL relocated its activities to a purpose built facility, Beith GIL, on Route de Chêne which hosts a synagogue as well as spaces for community activities.

== Beliefs ==
=== Marriage ===
The synagogue has an inclusive vision and celebrates both opposite-sex marriages and same-sex marriages.

== See also ==
- History of the Jews in Switzerland
- List of synagogues in Switzerland
