= Nessim Gaon =

Swiss financier (1922–2022)

- Born: Nessim David Gaon; 22 February 1922; Khartoum, Anglo-Egyptian Sudan, British Empire
- Died: 10 May 2022 (aged 100); Geneva, Switzerland
- Occupations: Financier, commodities trader
- Spouse: Renée Tamman (1927-2014)
- Children: 3

Nessim David Gaon (Arabic: نسيم جاعون; 22 February 1922 – 10 May 2022) was a Sudan-born Swiss financier who founded a trading conglomerate known as Noga SA. Outside the business world, he was very prominent in Jewish affairs, acting as president of the World Sephardi Federation since 1971. He was also a vice president of the World Jewish Congress and chairman of the board of governors of Ben-Gurion University of the Negev in Israel.

== Biography ==
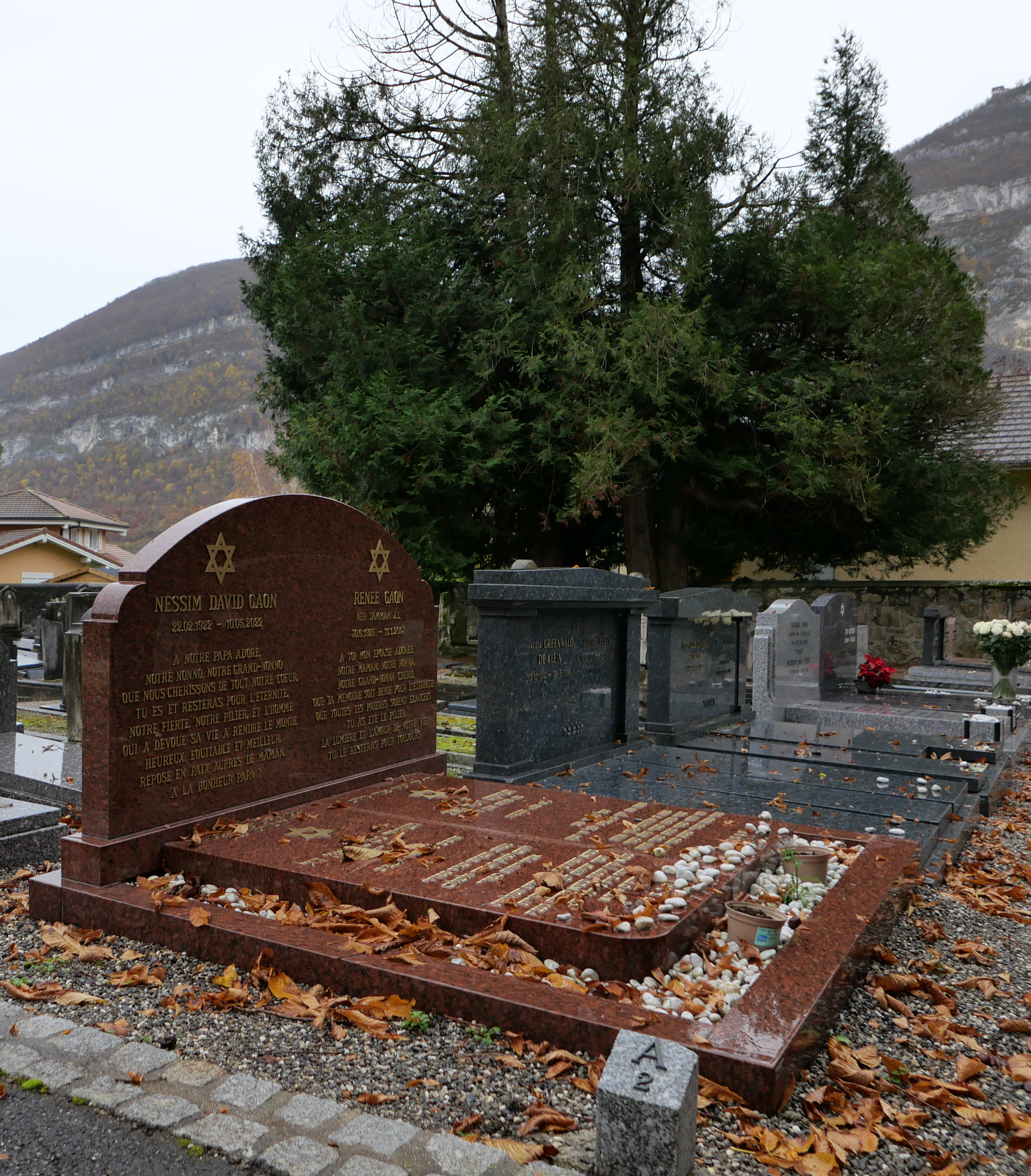
The grave of Gaon and his wife at the Jewish Cemetery of Veyrier-Étrembières.

Gaon was born in Sudan to Turkish Jews who had been transplanted to Spain and later moved to Egypt and then Sudan. He was married to Renée Tamman (1927–2014), with whom he had three children: Marguerite Herzog, David N. Gaon and Danielle Coën-Gaon.

Aside from the posts Gaon held in world Jewish organizations, he was the founder of Hekhal Haness Synagogue in Geneva.

== Business career ==
Gaon's career in trade began as a trader of burlap bags and crocodile and snake skins in Anglo-Egyptian Sudan before graduating to peanut and edible oils trade. When the British relinquished power in Sudan, subsequent increase in nationalism precipitated the exile of many members of the Jewish community in Khartoum. Gaon emigrated to Switzerland in 1957 and became a Swiss citizen six years later. He settled in Geneva and developed a commodities trading firm with success in the peanut trade. He also dabbled into property and tourism building the Noga Hilton Hotel in Geneva. Nigerian government officials visiting Geneva liked the hotel and invited Hilton and Gaon to establish a similar hotel in the newly created capital city of Abuja with construction expedited to host meeting of Heads of States of ECOWAS.

Gaon through his firms Noga Commodities Overseas and Afro Continental was involved in rice, edible oils cement trade in Nigeria during the country's oil boom years in the 1970s. In 1979, he was importing 120,000 tonnes of rice to Nigeria. However, a turn in Nigeria's economy in 1984 caused non payment of government's promissory notes tied to his firm's assets affected his commodity business.

Beginning in 1991, Gaon developed a barter trading interest with the Soviet Union that ended in acrimony, thereafter Gaon sought legal options to claim unpaid debts through confiscation of Russian assets abroad.
