= Swiss Federation of Jewish Communities =

Federation of Jewish communities in Switzerland

- Formation: 1904; 122 years ago
- Headquarters: Switzerland
- Region served: Switzerland
- Director: Ralph Lewin
- Website: swissjews.ch/en/

The Swiss Federation of Jewish Communities (SIG) is the umbrella organization representing most Swiss Jews.

== Description ==
The Swiss Federation of Jewish Communities represents 16 Jewish communities in Switzerland. The majority of Swiss Jews belong to these 16 communities. A few Orthodox and Reform communities in Switzerland operate independently of the federation. Three Reform communities in Basel, Geneva, and Zurich are instead members of the Platform for Liberal Jews in Switzerland (PLJS). In order to promote unity within the Jewish community, the SIG cooperates with the PLJS on political issues. SIG is a member of the European Jewish Congress and the World Jewish Congress, and cooperates with the European Council of Jewish Communities (ECJC) via the Association of Swiss Jewish Refugee Aid and Welfare Organisations, member of the ECJC. SIG and the GRA Foundation Against Racism and Antisemitism have documented antisemitic trends in Switzerland and published a joint annual report since 2008, latest in March 2026.

== History ==
The federation was founded in 1904 in order to protect the rights and interests of Swiss Jews, and in particular to oppose the Swiss ban on kosher slaughter, which the federation considered antisemitic. The federation managed to ensure the importation of small quantities of kosher meat.

== See also ==
- Berne Trial
- History of the Jews in Switzerland
