= History of the Jews in Switzerland =

Swiss Jews - Schweizer Juden - Juifs suisses - Ebrei svizzeri - שװײצער ייִדן
- The location of Switzerland (dark green) in Europe

Total population
- 20,000

Regions with significant populations
- Zurich, Geneva and Basel

Languages
- Swiss German, Swiss Standard German, Swiss French, Swiss Italian, Romansh, Hebrew, Yiddish

Religion
- Judaism

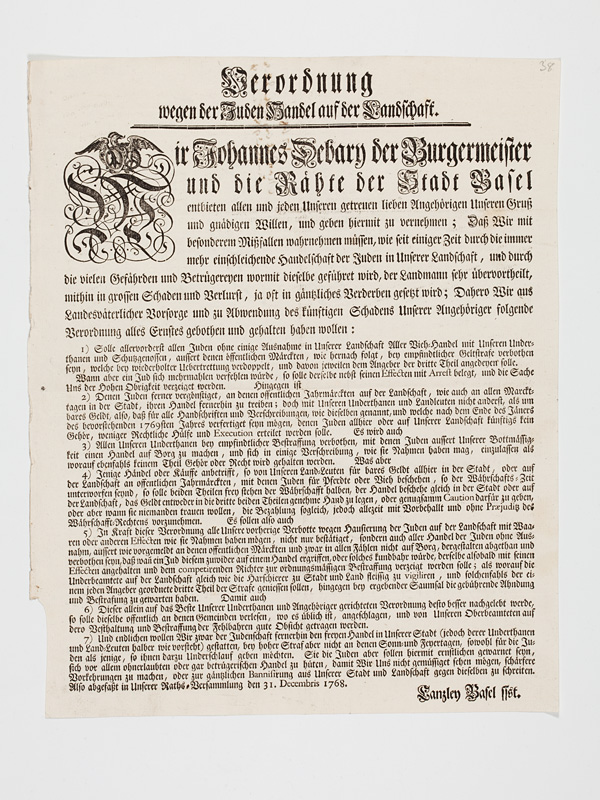
The "Decree on Jewish Rural Trade” („Verordnung wegen der Juden Handel auf der Landschaft“, 1768), in the collection of the Jewish Museum of Switzerland in Basel.

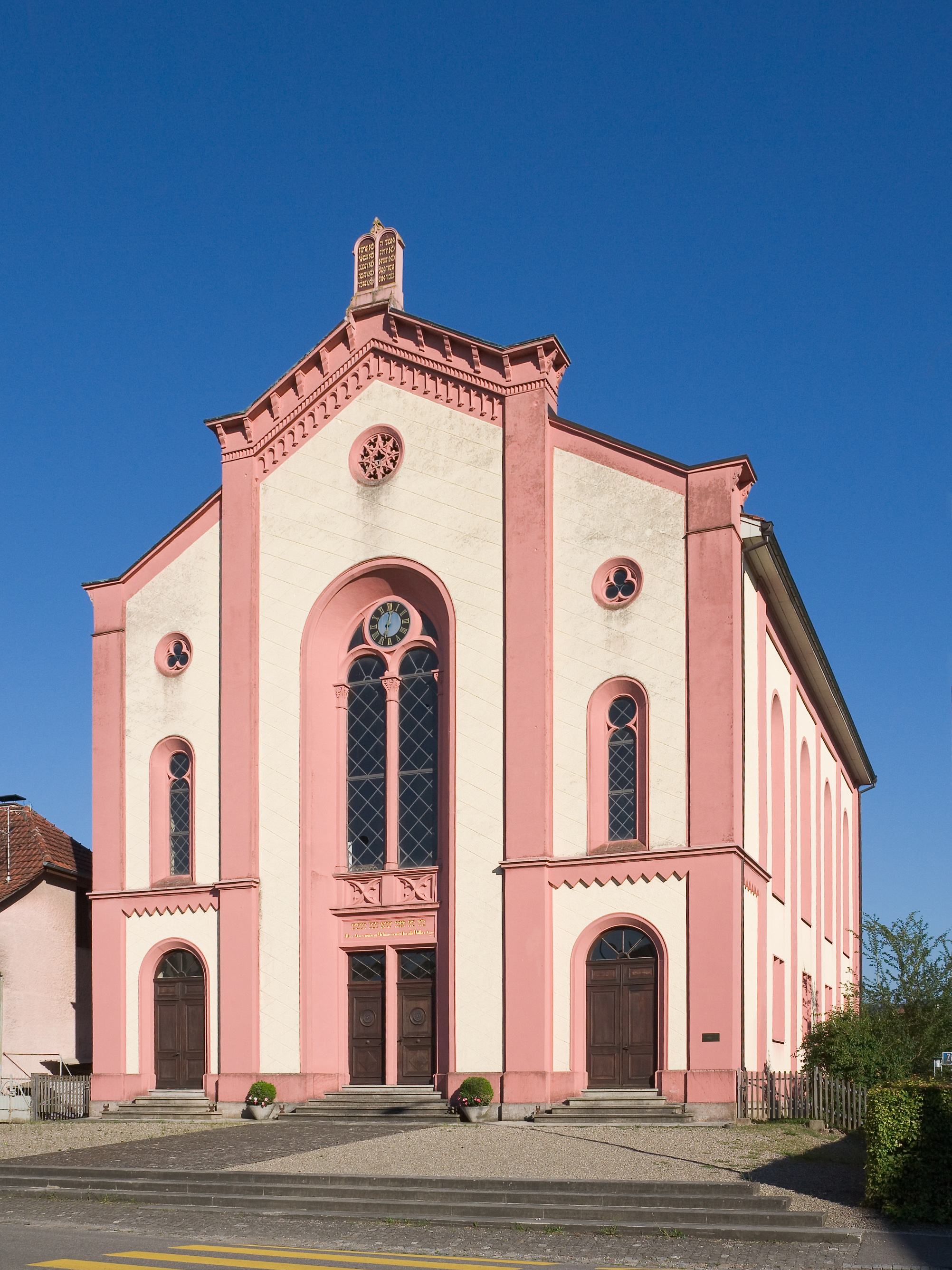
The synagogue of Lengnau.

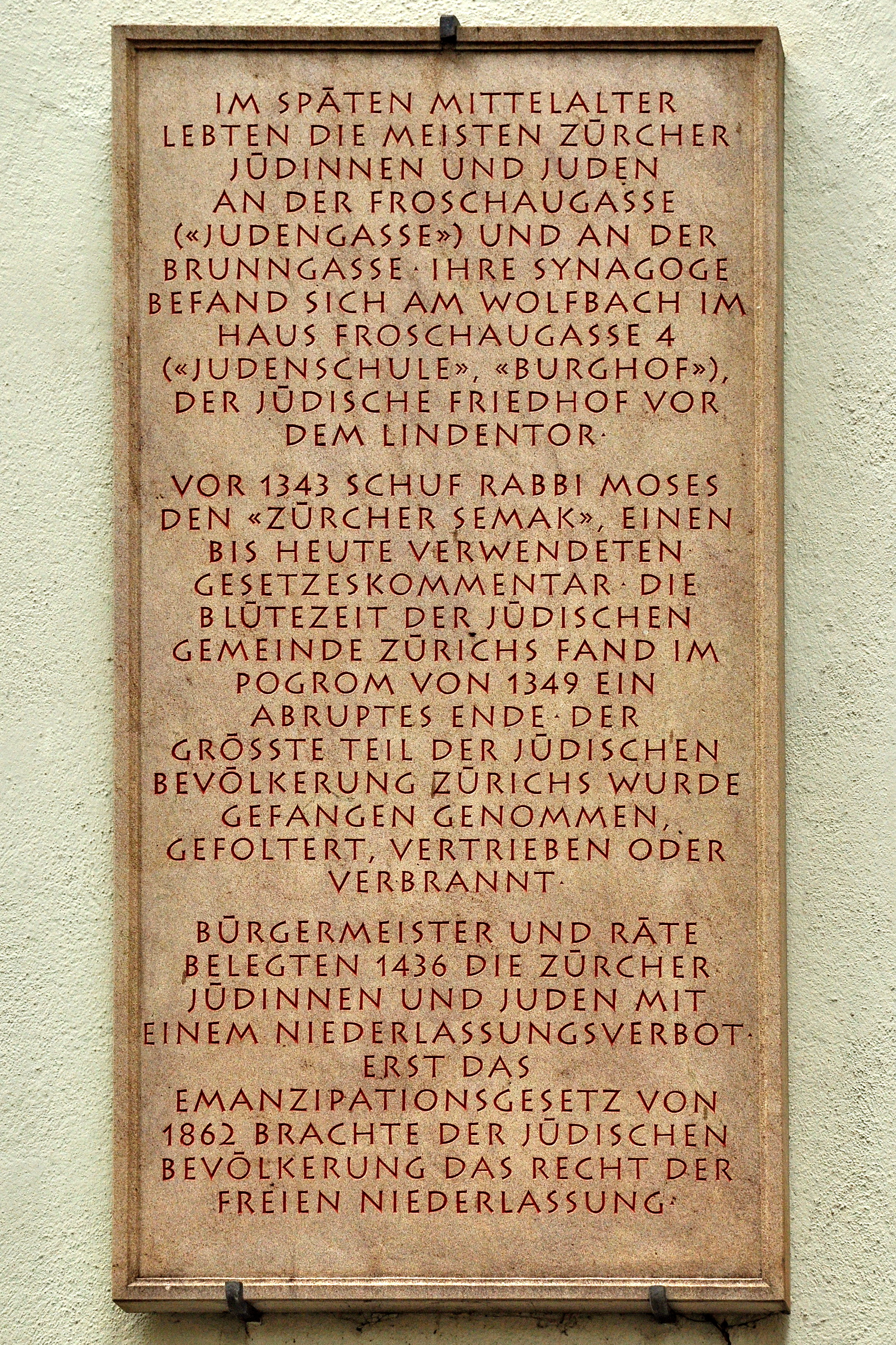
Synagogengasse, Neumarkt in Zurich

The history of the Jews in Switzerland extends back at least a thousand years. Jews and Judaism have been present in the territory of what is now Switzerland since before the emergence of the medieval Old Swiss Confederacy in the 13th century (the first communities settling in Basel in 1214).

Switzerland has Europe's tenth-largest Jewish community, with about 20,000 Jews, roughly 0.4% of the population. The majority of the Jewish communities are domiciled in the largest cities of the country, i.e. in Zurich, Geneva and Basel.

The first World Zionist Congress of 1897 was held in Basel, and took place ten times in the city — more than in any other city in the world. Basel is also home to the Jewish Museum of Switzerland, the first Jewish museum to have been opened in German-speaking Europe after the Second World War. Whereas the communities of Basel and Zurich are traditionally shaped by large Ashkenazi communities, Geneva also hosts an important Sephardic community. Its main synagogue, the Synagogue Hekhal Haness, is considered to be the most important Sephardic synagogue in Switzerland.

== History ==
=== Early history ===
A ring with a Menorah depiction found in Augusta Raurica (Kaiseraugst, Switzerland) in 2001 may attest to Jewish presence in Germania Superior, a province of the Roman Empire. The Encyclopaedia Judaica mentions a first documentation of Jews in Switzerland in 1214. In the Middle Ages, as in many places in Europe, they frequently suffered persecution; for example, in 1294 in Bern many Jews of the city were executed and the survivors expelled under the pretext of the murder of a Christian boy. Another pogrom occurred in Zurich in 1249; a plaque has been mounted at the location of the former synagogue at Froschaugasse 4 in the former Neumarkt quarter to commemorate the pogrom. The Jews were also victims of persecution during the Black Plague, which they were frequently accused of having caused by poisoning wells. In 1349, 600 Jews in Basel were burned at the stake and 140 children forcibly converted to Catholicism, while in Zurich Jews' belongings were confiscated and a number of Jews were burned at the stake. There were numerous such incidents during the period of the plague. In 1401, Schaffhausen was the location of the Schaffhausen Massacre.

=== Early Modern period ===
Jews were banished from the Swiss Cantons in the 1620s. From 1776 they were allowed to reside exclusively in two villages, Lengnau and Oberendingen, in what is now the canton of Aargau. At the close of the 18th century, the 553 Jews in these villages represented almost the entire Jewish population in Switzerland. An important source for the situation of Swiss Jews in the 18th century is the 1768 Sammlung Jüdischer Geschichten by Johann Caspar Ulrich.

Beginning in 1603, the deceased Jews of the Surbtal communities were buried on a small island in the river Rhein, called Judenäule ("Jew's island") which had been leased to the Jewish community. As the island was repeatedly flooded and devastated, in 1750 the Surbtal Jews asked the Tagsatzung to establish a cemetery in the vicinity of their communities in the Surb valley. Once a year, the communal chevra kadisha (hevra kadishah, Aramaic: חברא קדישא, Ḥebh'ra Qaddisha, meaning "holy society") visited the graves on the island. In 1750 the Tagsatzung 'allowed' the Jewish communities of Endingen and Lengnau to purchase woodland on a small hill between Endingen and Lengnau to establish the Endingen cemetery. The cemetery has been expanded several times. Based on an agreement concluded in 1859, two-fifths of the cemetery belong to the Israelite community of Lengnau, and three-fifths to the Israelite community of Endingen.

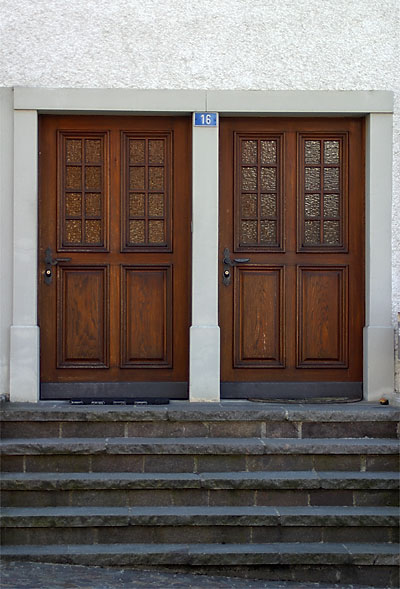
Two separate doors (one for Jews and one for Christians) on a house in Endingen

In accordance with a resolution of the Tagsatzung in 1678, Jews were allowed to settle in the communities of the Surb valley. After 1776, they were further restricted to residing in Endingen or Lengnau. Migration of Jews to these villages from elsewhere in Switzerland slowly but steadily changed the appearance of the communities. The village of Endingen never built a Christian church, only a Jewish synagogue. The local Christians traveled to neighboring villages for church services. Jewish and Christian families often lived under one roof.

Jewish residents were restricted as to the professions they could practise. Houses were built with two separate entrances, one for Jews and one for Christians. They were under the jurisdiction of the high and low courts of the Baden bailiff and had to buy "protection and safety" letters patent from the authorities. Furthermore, regulations in the 18th century decreed that Jews were allowed to buy and sell their livestock only in open markets and not directly from the farmer. Christians had no such regulations.

=== Napoleonic era ===
In 1798, the French invaded Switzerland and established the Helvetic Republic. The Republic attempted to modernize and centralize the Swiss Confederation which was not a unified country, but rather an alliance of sovereign states. As part of this new, liberal state, Swiss reformers attempted to emancipate the Jews in the new Helvetic Parliament in Aarau. When those efforts failed, they attempted to get the French to force this change on the new Swiss government. The changes of the Republic were not embraced by many of the Swiss and the issue of emancipation for the Jews became another contentious issue between the old order and the new government.

In 1802 a portion of the population revolted and turned against the Jews. The mob looted the Jewish villages of Endingen and Lengnau in the so-called Zwetschgenkrieg ("Plum war"). At the same time other revolts, such as the Stecklikrieg, stretched the French Army too thin for French authorities to guarantee the Jews' safety. Napoleon lacked the troops to bring peace to Switzerland, and needed the Swiss regiments for his campaigns. Seeking a peaceful resolution to the uprising, in 1803 he issued the Act of Mediation. The Act of Mediation was a compromise between the Ancien Regime and a Republic. One of the compromises in the Act was that no further rights were granted to the Jews.

=== Modern Switzerland ===
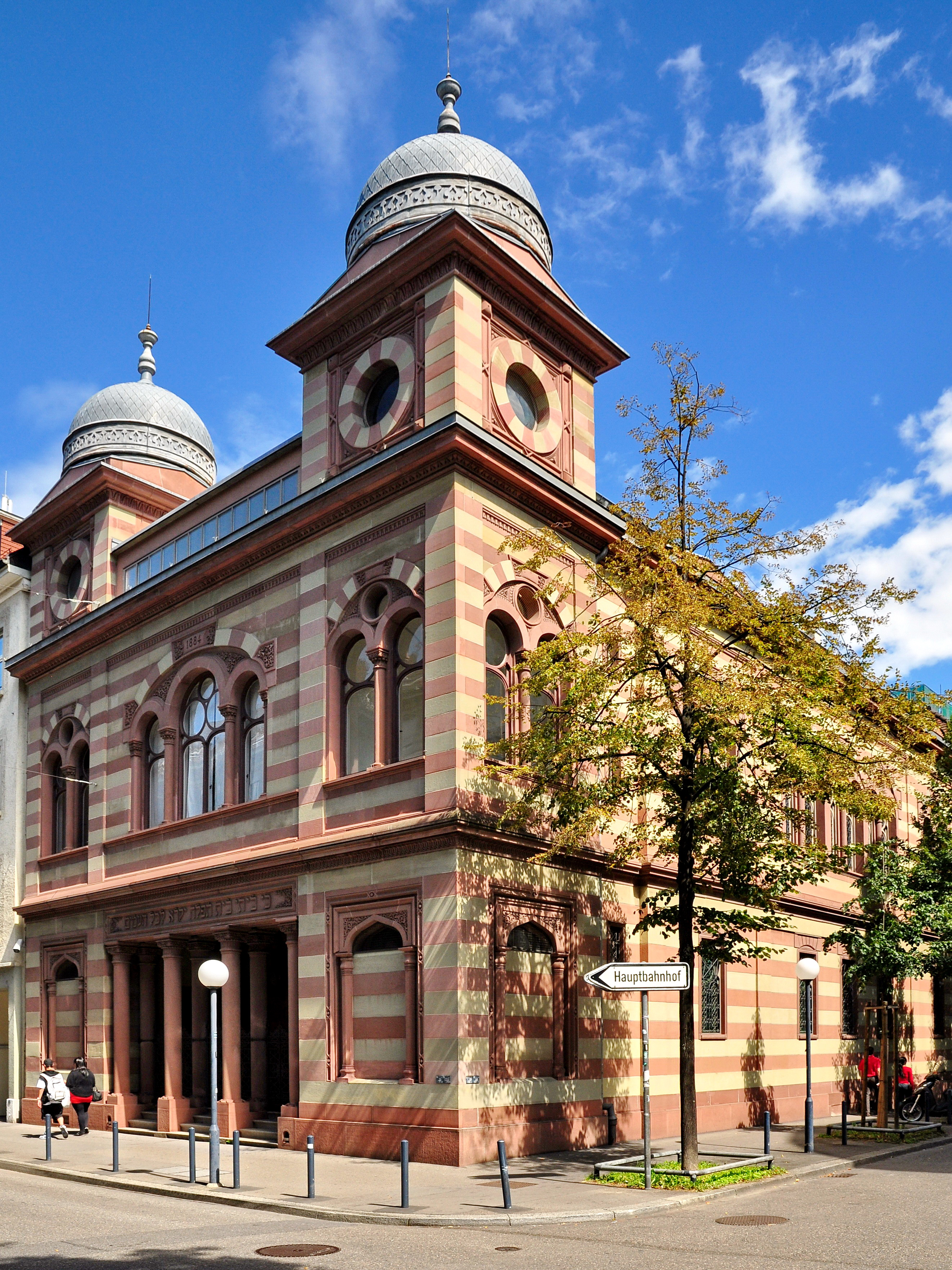
Synagoge Zürich Löwenstrasse

By the mid-19th century the village of Endingen had about 2,000 inhabitants, about half Jews and half Christians. By comparison, the town of Baden had about 1,500 people at the same time.

The Jewish population was fairly well tolerated, self-managed and maintained its own school. In 1862 the Jewish community of Zurich, the Israelitische Cultusgemeinde Zürich (ICZ) was founded, and in 1884 the Synagoge Zürich was built at the Löwenstrasse road. In 1879 a Jewish village of Neu-Endingen was built. It remained mostly independent until 1983 when it merged back into the village of Endingen.

The right to settle freely was not restored to Jews with the Swiss constitution of 1848, and was only granted after approval in a referendum in 1866. Two instrumental Jewish figures in the struggle for emancipation were teacher and publicist Markus G. Dreyfus and rabbi and historian Meyer Kayserling. The rights of Jews in Switzerland were strengthened with the revised constitution of 1874. Article 49 of the 1874 constitution guarantees the freedom of religion.

In 1876, the Jews were granted full equality in civil rights and allowed to travel. By 1920, most Jews had left the Surb Valley. During the late 19th and early 20th centuries, many Jews from Alsace, Germany and Eastern Europe joined this core group. In 1920, the Jewish population had reached its peak at 21,000 people (0.5% of the total population), a figure that has remained almost constant ever since.

In 1999 Ruth Dreifuss became the first Jewish president of the Swiss Federal Council.

== Language ==
Jews living in the Surb Valley once spoke a dialect of Western Yiddish, traces of which can be still found today in the region. Western Yiddish is mainly a mixture of High German dialects, with Hebrew and Aramaic vocabulary, as well as some influence from Romance languages. It is distinguished from Eastern Yiddish in that it has far fewer Slavic loanwords (see Yiddish). Unlike Eastern Yiddish, which is spoken to some degree by Polish and American Jews, Western Yiddish has almost disappeared. Today there are only a few, mostly elderly Jews who know the dialect of the Surb Valley Jews, and the Sound Archives at the University of Zurich have begun recording what is left of the dialect.

== Demographics ==
According to the 2000 census, the Jewish population of Switzerland was at 17,914 (0.2% of the total population). In 2015 there were 17,250 Jewish people over the age of 15 in Switzerland (about 0.25% of the total). Although the number of Jews has remained fairly stable since the thirties, their percentage of the Swiss population has fallen considerably. This plateau is due to immigration, without which Swiss Jews could not have prevented a demographic setback, linked to an aging population and the many mixed marriages. Among the Cantons of Switzerland, only Zurich, Basel-City, Geneva and Vaud have a Jewish community exceeding 1,000 people. One third of Swiss Jews reside in the Canton of Zurich (in 2015, 6,045 people over 15).

Year	Jewish population	%
1850	3,145	0.1
1860	4,216	0.2
1870	6,996	0.3
1880	7,373	0.3
1888	8,069	0.3
1900	12,264	0.4
1910	18,462	0.5
1920	20,979	0.5
1930	17,973	0.4
1941	19,429	0.4
1950	19,048	0.4
1960	19,984	0.4
1970	20,744	0.3
1980	18,330	0.3
1990	17,577	0.2
2000	17,914	0.2
2010	20,991	0.4

== Places with a Jewish community ==
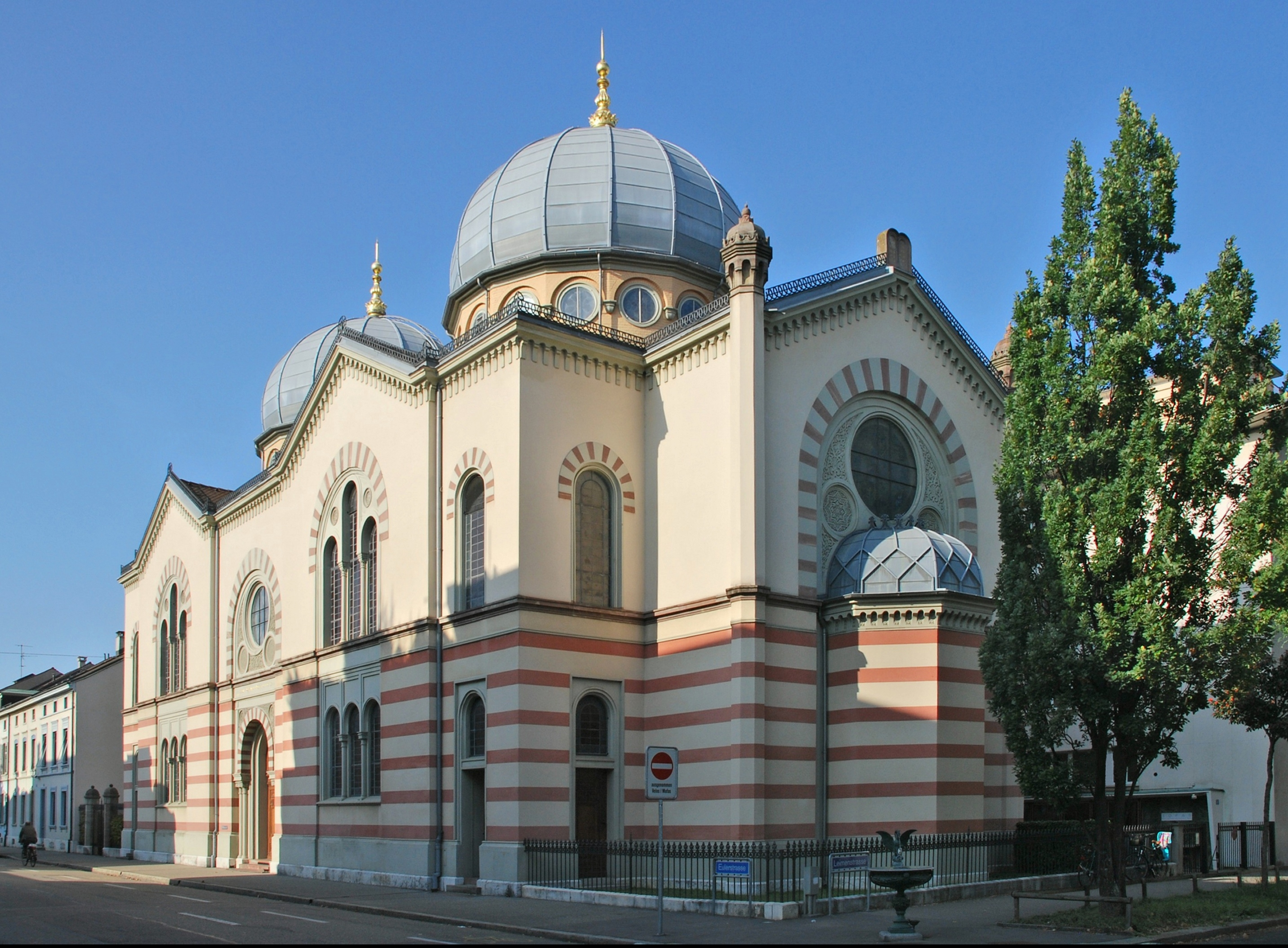
The main synagogue of Basel

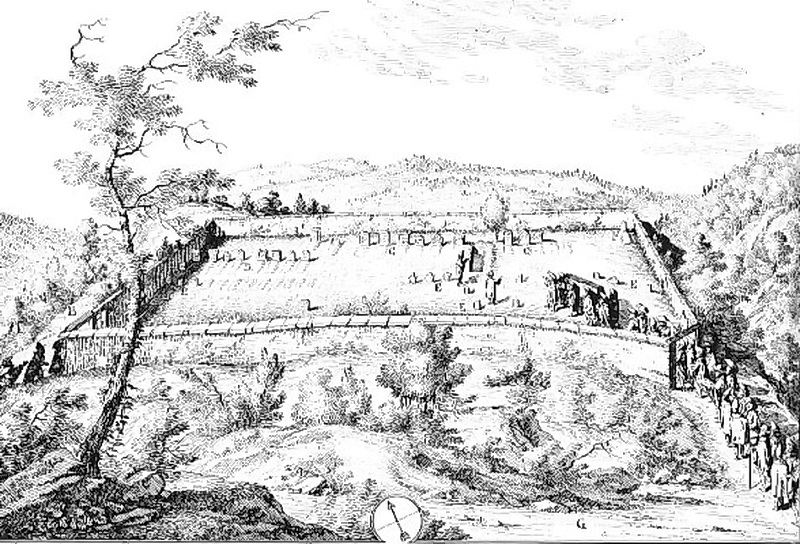
1754 drawing of the Jewish cemetery in Endingen by Johann Caspar Ulrich.

- Baden
- Basel (→ Main article: History of the Jews in Basel)
  - Israelitische Gemeinde Basel
  - Israelitische Religionsgesellschaft Basel
  - Liberale Jüdische Gemeinde Migwan
- Bern (→ Main article: History of the Jews in Bern)
  - Jüdische Gemeinde Bern
- Biel/Bienne
- Bremgarten
- La Chaux-de-Fonds
- Endingen AG
- Freiburg
  - Israelitische Gemeinde Tafers
- Geneva (→ Main article: History of the Jews in Geneva)
  - Communauté Israélite de Genève
  - Communauté Israélite Libérale de Genève
  - Synagogue Sépharade Hekhal Haness
- Kreuzlingen
- Lausanne
- Lengnau AG
- Lugano
- Lucerne
- St. Gallen
- Vevey and Montreux
- Winterthur
- Zurich (→ Main article: History of the Jews in Zurich)
  - Israelitische Cultusgemeinde Zürich (ICZ)
  - Israelitische Religionsgesellschaft Zürich (IRGZ)
  - Jewish community Agudas Achim Zurich
  - Jewish liberal community Or Chadasch Zurich (the first liberal community in German-speaking Europe after 1945)

The communities of Porrentruy, Yverdon, Avenches, Davos and Delemont dissolved due to a lack of members.

== Antisemitism in Switzerland ==
=== Expulsion and Emancipation ===
In 1622, most of the Jews except for physicians were expelled from all of Switzerland except for two villages in the canton of Aargau. Those allowed to stay were discriminated against in financial matters (School budgets) and family rights (Marriage). Emancipation managed to make a slight positive change for the Jews in Switzerland. Countries such as Great Britain, France and the U.S pressured Switzerland to grant equal rights to all citizens, which was officially granted by a modification of the constitution in 1874.

=== Prohibition of Kosher Slaughter ===
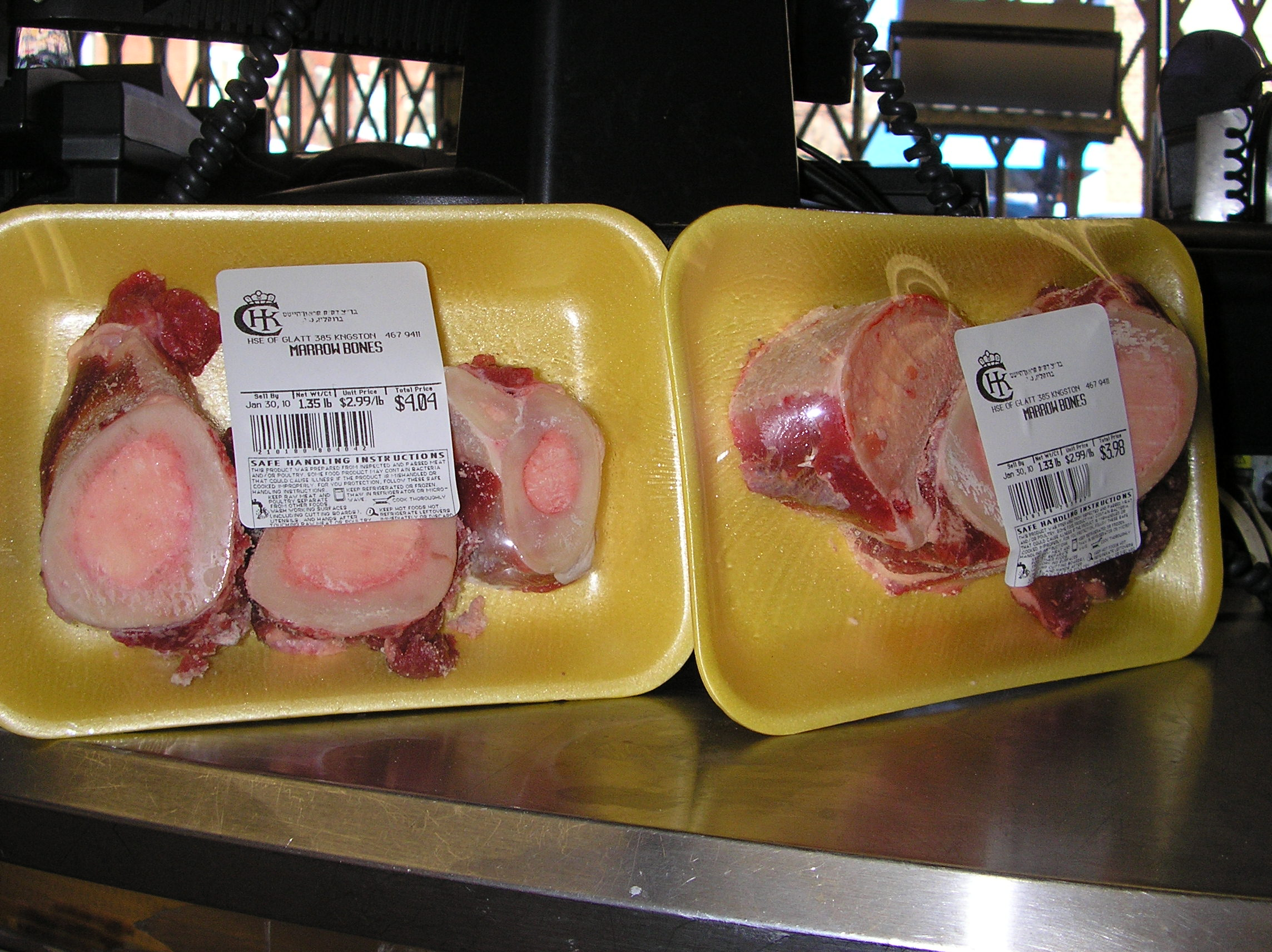
Meat that has been Kosher slaughtered

Swiss Jews received full legal equality in 1874. However, ritual slaughter (shchitah kshera) was later prohibited. In 1886, organizations against cruelty to animals demanded the government forbid kosher slaughter. In 1893 the ban was approved in a nationwide referendum and Kosher Shechita was forbidden in Switzerland. This prohibition has not been lifted to the present day. The issue of kosher slaughter has remained politically relevant and Jewish communities have campaigned for a change in the law. In 2002, the Swiss government allowed Jews to import kosher meat, however members of Switzerland's Jewish community were not satisfied. Alfred Donath (president of the Jewish Federations) said that the law is "discriminatory and a violation of human rights and religious freedom". One of the opponents to the demands of the Jewish community, Erwin Kessler (president of the Vaud section of the Society for the protection of animals) said: "either become vegetarians or leave Switzerland". For this, and other comments comparing Jewish butchers to Nazis, Kessler was sentenced to jail for five months under Swiss laws against incitement of racial hatred in 2004. A study in the Jewish Political Studies Review (published by the Jerusalem Center for Public Affairs) comes to the conclusion that the real motive behind the ban at the time was to limit Jewish immigration to Switzerland from Eastern Europe.

=== The Holocaust ===
Approximately 23,000 Jews found refuge in Switzerland, yet the government decided to stay neutral and to only be a country of transit for Jewish refugees. Jewish refugees were treated differently from refugees of other religions with regards to the financial support they received.

==== The J Stamp Affair ====
In the late 1990s it was widely reported by both Swiss and American media that the Swiss government had in 1938 asked Germany to stamp "J" on the passport of Jews in order to make it easier to refuse admission to Jewish refugees. This was based on a 1954 article by Swiss news magazine Beobachter, which had originally revealed the J Stamp and branded it an invention of Swiss police chief during WWII, Heinrich Rothmund. However, in mid-2001, Beobachter retracted its claims and exonerated Rothmund based on new documents and stated the German side made the initial suggestion. Similarly, the Bergier Commission, a grouping of international historians tasked with investigating Switzerland's ties to Nazi Germany did not label the stamp a "Swiss idea" in its final report, stating only that it came out of negotiations between Nazi Germany and Switzerland (although notably Swiss ambassador to Germany Hans Frölicher's support for the "J-Stamp", as part of the then-ongoing 1938 negotiations with the Nazis, was also mentioned) .

==== Entry Denials of Jewish Refugees ====
When thousands of Jews tried to flee Austria after the Anschluss in March 1938, and again in 1942-1943 when Jews tried to escape deportation from France, the Netherlands, and Belgium, a large part of them were denied access to the country. According to the Bergier Commission final report, during the Second World War, Switzerland granted asylum to 25,000 Jews while denying around 20,000 refugees (of which a significant portion were estimated to be Jewish) admission to the country in total. However, Serge Klarsfeld, the French-Jewish historian, activist and Nazi Hunter stated in 2013 that the Swiss authorities rejected fewer WWII Jewish refugees than believed. Based on his own research, Klarsfeld claimed that the number of entry denials was closer to 3000. Most of the refugees had departed by 1953.

==== Help Networks ====
Help networks did exist, the most notable being the Ładoś Group (also known as the Bern Group), which gained greater public attention in Switzerland following an exhibition at the Jewish Museum in Basel. Centred around the Polish embassy in Bern, a network of diplomats and other supporters worked to provide between 7000 and 10,000 endangered Jews with Latin American travel documents and identity papers. Many recipients nevertheless did not survive the Holocaust.

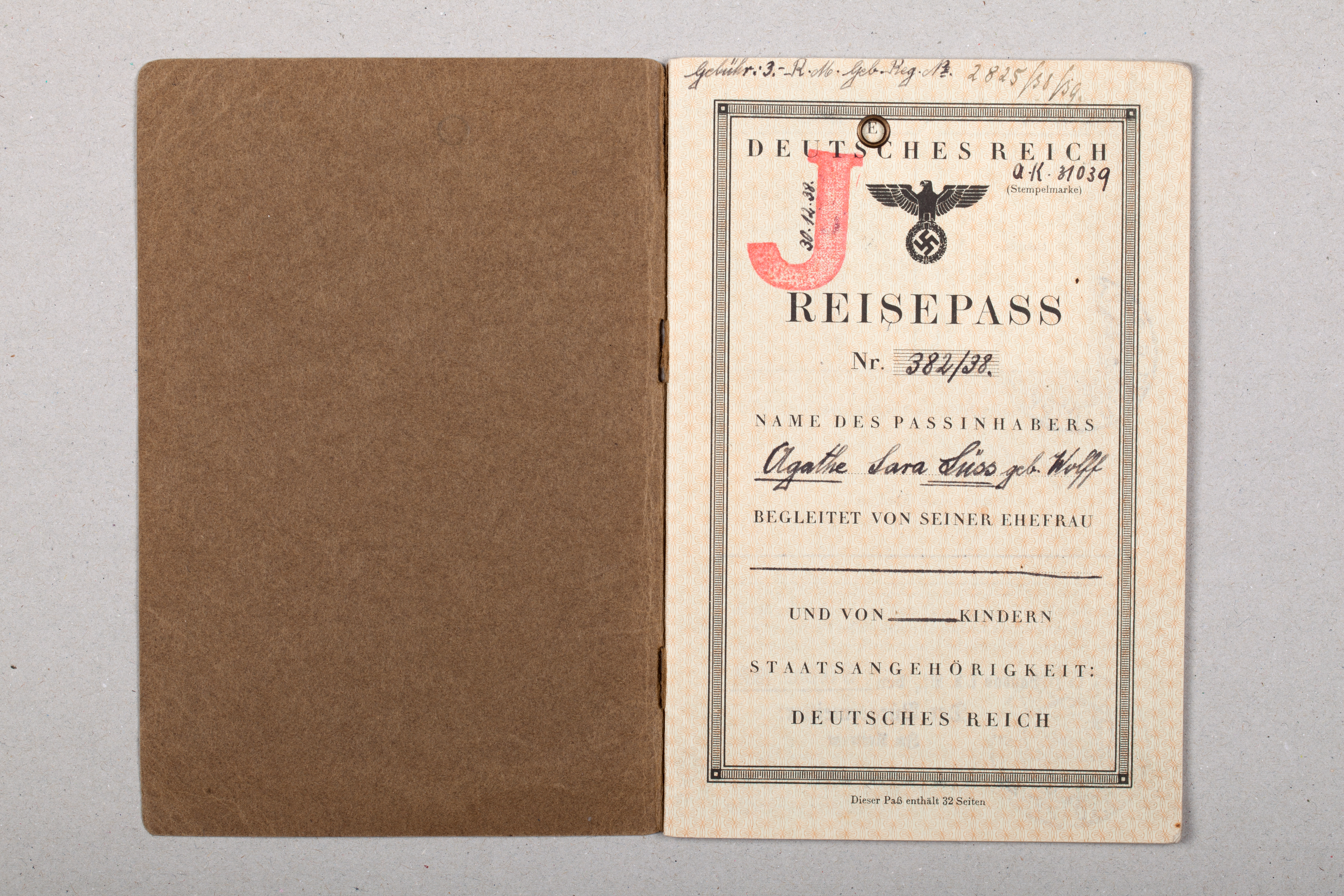
The passport pictured here belonged to Agatha Süss. It is today in the Jewish Museum of Switzerland's collection in Basel.

=== Post-World War II ===
Switzerland has in general been supportive toward Israel, while maintaining its neutrality in the wider Israel-Palestine conflict. This support was strengthened when in 1969 an Arab terrorist attack was committed against an El Al plane in Zurich and when an act of sabotage was committed against a Swissair plane bound for Israel in 1970. However, like other European countries, anti-Semitism and anti-Israel sentiments have increased since 2000 according to the Stephen Roth Institute for the Study of Contemporary Anti-Semitism and Racism.

In 1998, according to the New York Times and the Chicago Tribune, anti-Semitism increased in Switzerland in reaction to the then heightened scrutiny of the country's actions during the Second World War and the World Jewish Congress lawsuit against Swiss Banks. A yearlong study found that inhibitions against the open expression of racist views had been swept away by the controversy of Swiss banks' responsibility to compensate Holocaust victims for assets lost during World War II. The controversy broadened into a wide-ranging examination of Switzerland's role in the war.

A survey from 2014 found that more than one in four Swiss residents are anti-Semitic, making Switzerland's population one of the most anti-Jewish in Western Europe, according to an online report released by the Anti-Defamation League. Israeli military engagements are often blamed for spikes of antisemitism in Switzerland, such as the 2014 Israel–Gaza conflict. According to a report by the CFCA (the Coordination Forum Countering Antisemitism), there has been a dramatic increase in the number of antisemitic incidents in Switzerland. From July 2014 and the outbreak of the war in Gaza, the Federation of Jewish Communities in Switzerland reported twice as many incidents as usually occur during an entire year. The report's conclusions are that the current situation is far more dramatic than other wars in the Middle East that have caused a similar reaction by the Swiss population. In 15 cases the incidents resulted in complaints being filed with the police. Statements appearing in letters or on Facebook have become far more violent. The Federation also reported insults and threats. The European Jewish Congress contends that those statistics demonstrate a "huge increase in anti-Semitic incidents in Switzerland", quoting a different survey made by the Intercommunity Coordination against Anti-Semitism and Defamation - CICAD. The CICAD reported a physical assault against a Jewish man, five incidents of threats, three incidents of damage to property, and three incidents of graffiti. One of those incidents was reported on by Haaretz: "An Orthodox Jew from Belgium was lightly wounded in an assault in Switzerland, which witnesses called an anti-Semitic attack. The victim, identified only as A. Wachsstock, was walking toward his car, where his wife and four children were waiting for him, when a man in his sixties began hitting him and shouting anti-Semitic profanities, including “Juden raus,” or “Jews, get out” in German.

In February 2024, Swiss police investigated a winter sport rental at the foot of the Pischa mountain in Davos for banning Jewish customers (the notice in Hebrew at the rental read "Due to various very annoying incidents, including the theft of a sled, we no longer rent sports equipment to our Jewish brothers. This applies to all equipment such as sleds, air boards, ski jacks and snowshoes. Thank you very much for understanding."), but the rental quickly reversed its decision following public backlash. The incident sparked criticism and condemnation from anti-racism groups and the Swiss Federation of Jewish Communities. Following this incident, the Swiss Federation of Jewish Communities (SIG) and local Davos representatives engaged in a series of negotiations, mediated by an external private agency specializing in mediation and conflict resolution. The resulting agreement, a ten-point plan, aims to foster better understanding and integration of Jewish guests in Davos. This plan, released in early July 2024, includes the establishment of a contact point for Jewish visitors, increased engagement with rabbis in an advisory role, the expansion of an SIG antisemitism prevention project, and revised informational materials on rules of conduct for all visitors, to be made available to them in advance of their visit. Additionally, initiatives will focus on educating both foreign guests and the local population about Swiss customs and the history of Jewish life in the region. Measures to manage tourism flows and promote equal treatment of all guests in tourism businesses were also agreed upon.

In March 2024, a 50-year-old Orthodox Jewish man was stabbed and critically injured in Zurich. The attack was allegedly carried out by a 15-year-old Swiss national of Tunisian descent who had pledged allegiance to the Islamic State and called for a “battle against the Jews". Swiss President Viola Amherd expressed shock over the attack and emphasized that "antisemitism has no place in Switzerland".

In September 2024, two Arab-speaking men were arrested for an antisemitic attack against a British Jew in Davos, Switzerland.

The Times of Israel reported that antisemitic incidents in Switzerland tripled between October 7, 2023 and March 2024 and called the increase "unprecedented." Swiss Federation of Jewish Communities president Ralph Lewin stated that "As a result of the dreadful terror attacks by Hamas on October 7, 2023, antisemitism has also manifested itself in Switzerland in a way that we could not imagine.”

=== Male circumcision controversy ===
Male circumcision is legal in Switzerland. However, In July 2012, both Zurich Children's Hospital and St Gallen Children's Hospital briefly suspended performing circumcisions pending a review of the ethics surrounding the procedure. This was prompted by developments in neighbouring Germany where a court ruled so-called 'voluntary circumcisions' amount to wilful criminal bodily harm. The suspension was lifted in August 2012.

== Cinema and television ==
- Das Boot ist voll, a 1981 Swiss film
- Grüningers Fall, a 1997 Swiss documentary film
- Akte Grüninger, a 2013 Swiss-Austrian film
- Wolkenbruch's Wondrous Journey Into the Arms of a Shiksa, a 2018 Swiss film

== See also ==
- History of the Jews in Basel
- History of the Jews in Bern
- History of the Jews in Geneva
- History of the Jews in Zurich
- Surbtaler Juden
- Religion in Switzerland
- Switzerland during the World Wars
- Ruth Dreifuss, first Swiss Federal Councillor of Jewish origin
