= Israelitische Religionsgesellschaft Zürich =

Orthodox community in Zurich Switzerland

Total population
- 350 members

Regions with significant populations
- Zürich, Switzerland

Religions
- Hareidi Orthodox Judaism

Languages
- Standard German (formal speeches and announcements), Swiss German (vernacular)

IRGZ Synagogue
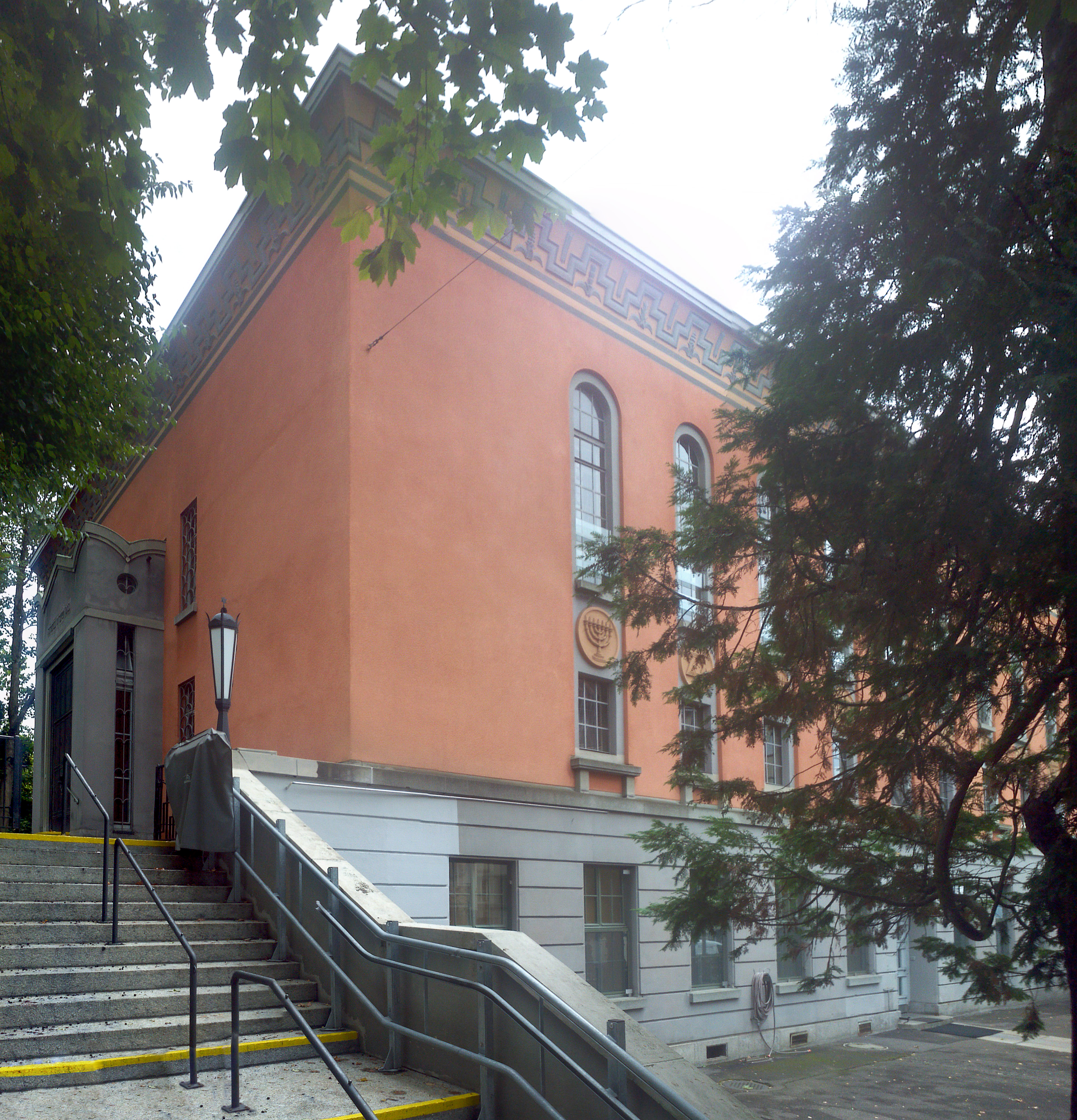
- The synagogue in 2019

- Location of the synagogue in the Canton of Zürich

Religion
- Affiliation: Orthodox Judaism
- Rite: Hareidi; Nusach Ashkenaz
- Ecclesiastical or organizational status: Synagogue
- Ownership: Israelitische Religionsgesellschaft Zürich (IRGZ)
- Status: Active

Location
- Location: Freigutstrasse 37, Zürich
- Country: Switzerland
- Interactive map of IRGZ Synagogue
- Coordinates: 47°22′08″N 8°31′48″E

Architecture
- Architects: Walter Henauer; Ernst Witschi
- Type: Synagogue architecture
- Style: Art Deco
- Established: 1895 (as a congregation)
- Groundbreaking: 1923
- Completed: 1924
- Materials: Brick

Israelitische Religionsgesellschaft Zürich (literally: Israelite Religious Society Zürich; Hebrew: עדת ישורון ציריך; commonly shortened to IRGZ), is one of two Hareidi Orthodox Jewish communities, located in Zürich, Switzerland.

== Description ==
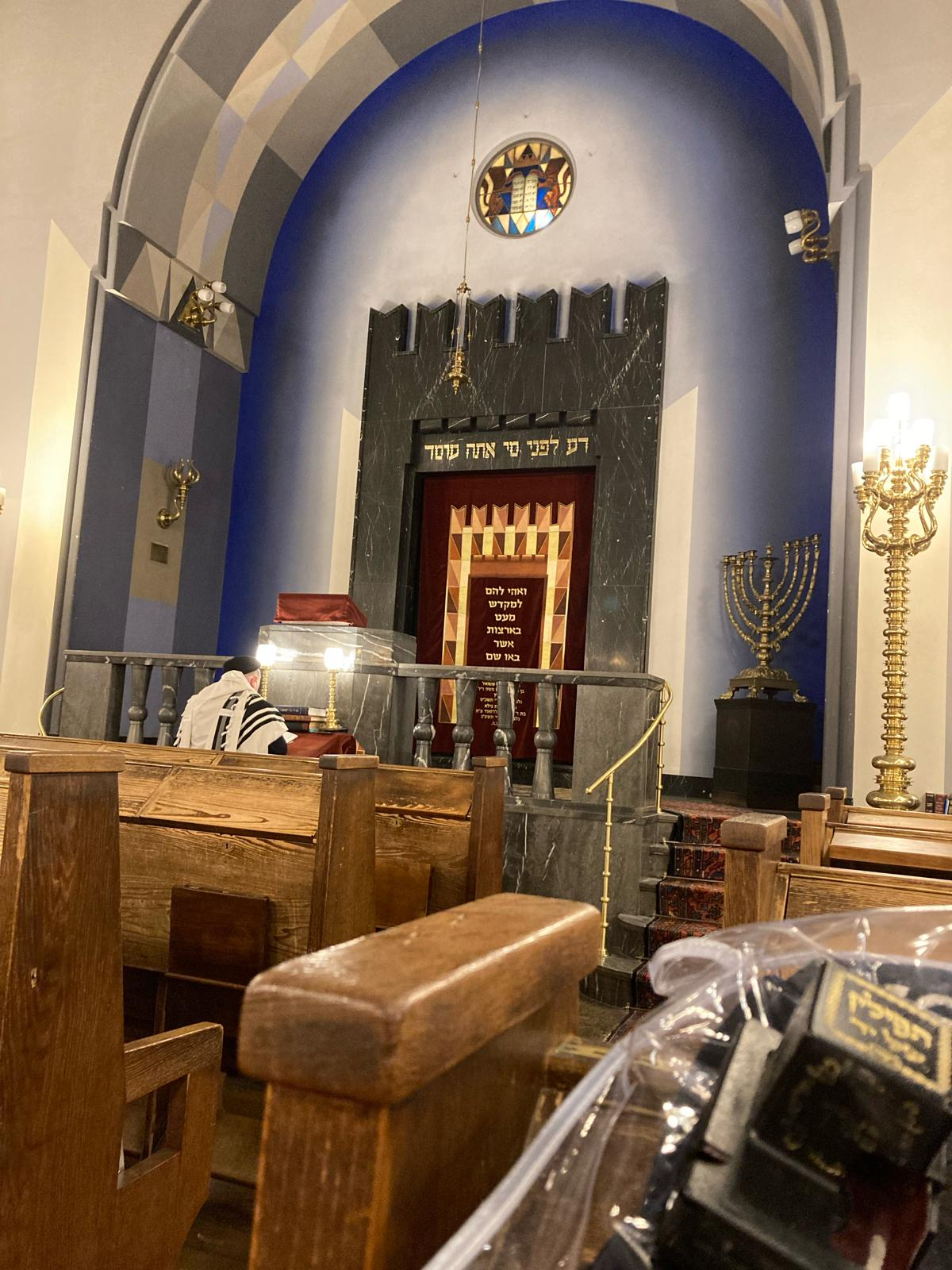
Interior of the Synagogue

The community has approximately 350 members, and it has been a member of the Schweizerische Israelitische Gemeindebund (SIG, literally Swiss Federation of Israelite Communities) since 1918.

The community was founded in 1895 as an unofficial organization, and at its inception it was part of the Israelitische Cultusgemeinde Zürich, or ICZ. Three years later, it separated from the ICZ due to disagreements over the level of religiosity. Already in 1890, Josua Goldschmidt, Josef Ettlinger and Isidor Kohn started their own minyan in Zürich. Because of their strictly Orthodox worldview, they no longer wanted to participate in the ICZ. Lepold Weill gave them a room to use in his residence, which they used to start the new community.

The community is committed to the values of neo-Orthodoxy as established by Rabbi Samson Rafael Hirsch in the 19th century. It is the only German-speaking community with this ideology that has existed uninterrupted for the last century. In the main shul, they are particular that prayers are pronounced using the Western European/German pronunciation of Hebrew. They use Rödelheim prayer books, and recite almost all of the piyyutim in the Western Ashkenazic rite. In the beginning of the 20th century, immigrants from Eastern Europe began to arrive in Zürich. In 1912, they started the Agudas Achim (Zürich). The later is also a Hareidi community, and they pray according to Hasidic rite. Nevertheless, since the 1960s, there is a lot of cooperation between the communities, especially in the realm of Kashrut supervision.

== Facilities of the community ==
The community has a large synagogue on Freigutstrasse, which was designed by the architects Henauer und Witschi in the Art Deco style. There is also a community center in Brandschenkesteig, and a cemetery in the town of Fällanden. There are also schools for boys and girls closely associated with the community, that operate under separate auspices.

== See also ==
- History of the Jews in Switzerland
- List of synagogues in Switzerland
