= 1866 Swiss referendum =

A nine-part referendum was held in Switzerland on 14 January 1866. Only two proposals received a majority of votes in favour, and only one had both a majority of votes and majority of cantons.

== Background ==
In order to pass, the referendums needed a double majority; a majority of the popular vote and majority of the cantons. The decision of each canton was based on the vote in that canton. Full cantons counted as one vote, whilst half cantons counted as half.

== Results ==
=== Question I – weights and measures ===
Choice	Popular vote		Cantons		
Choice	Votes	%	Full	Half	Total
For	159,182	50.4	8	3	9.5
Against	156,396	49.6	11	3	12.5
Invalid/blank votes		–	–	–	–
Total	315,578	100	19	6	22
Source: Nohlen & Stöver

=== Question II – equality of rights to settlement for Jews and naturalised people ===
Choice	Popular vote		Cantons		
Choice	Votes	%	Full	Half	Total
For	170,032	53.2	11	3	12.5
Against	149,401	46.8	8	3	9.5
Invalid/blank votes		–	–	–	–
Total	319,433	100	19	6	22
Source: Nohlen & Stöver

=== Question III – local suffrage for settled people ===
Choice	Popular vote		Cantons		
Choice	Votes	%	Full	Half	Total
For	137,321	43.1	7	2	8
Against	181,441	56.9	12	4	14
Invalid/blank votes		–	–	–	–
Total	318,762	100	19	6	22
Source: Nohlen & Stöver

=== Question IV – taxation and civil rights of settled people ===
Choice	Popular vote		Cantons		
Choice	Votes	%	Full	Half	Total
For	125,924	39.9	8	2	9
Against	189,830	60.1	11	4	13
Invalid/blank votes		–	–	–	–
Total	315,754	100	19	6	22
Source: Nohlen & Stöver

=== Question V – cantonal suffrage for settled people ===
Choice	Popular vote		Cantons		
Choice	Votes	%	Full	Half	Total
For	153,469	48.1	9	2	10
Against	165,679	51.9	10	4	12
Invalid/blank votes		–	–	–	–
Total	319,148	100	19	6	22
Source: Nohlen & Stöver

=== Question VI – religious and cultural freedom ===
Choice	Popular vote		Cantons		
Choice	Votes	%	Full	Half	Total
For	157,629	49.2	10	2	11
Against	162,992	50.8	9	4	11
Invalid/blank votes		–	–	–	–
Total	320,621	100	19	6	22
Source: Nohlen & Stöver

=== Question VII – criminal law ===
Choice	Popular vote		Cantons		
Choice	Votes	%	Full	Half	Total
For	108,364	34.2	6	1	6.5
Against	208,619	65.8	13	5	15.5
Invalid/blank votes		–	–	–	–
Total	316,983	100	19	6	22
Source: Nohlen & Stöver

=== Question VIII – copyright law ===
Choice	Popular vote		Cantons		
Choice	Votes	%	Full	Half	Total
For	137,476	43.7	8	3	9.5
Against	177,386	56.3	11	3	12.5
Invalid/blank votes		–	–	–	–
Total	314,862	100	19	6	22
Source: Nohlen & Stöver

=== Question IX – prohibition of gambling and lotteries ===
Choice	Popular vote		Cantons		
Choice	Votes	%	Full	Half	Total
For	139,062	44.0	8	3	9.5
Against	176,788	56.0	11	3	12.5
Invalid/blank votes		–	–	–	–
Total	315,850	100	19	6	22
Source: Nohlen & Stöver
