= Sternen Grill =

Restaurant in Zurich, Switzerland

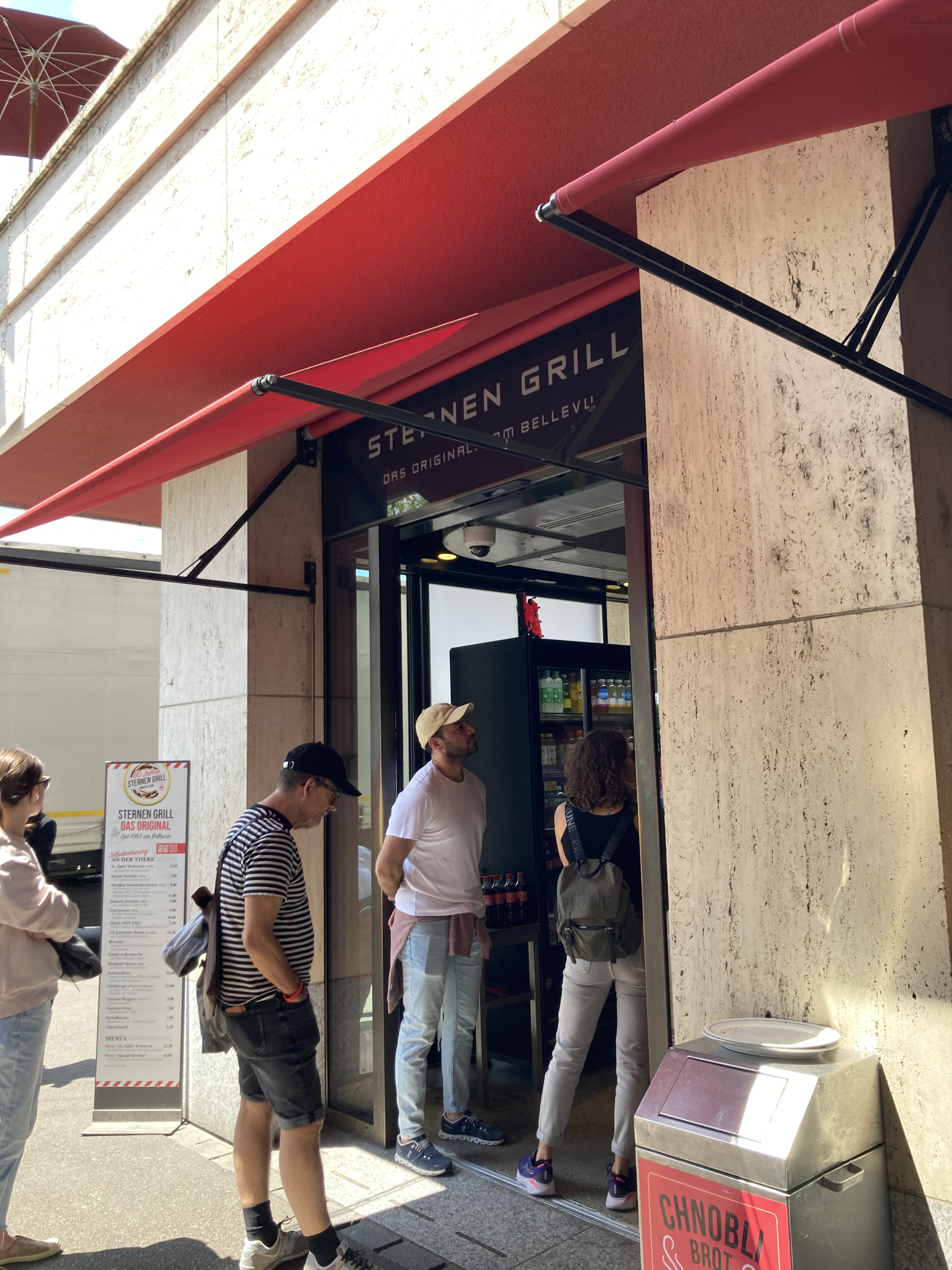
- The exterior of the restaurant in 2024

- Location within Canton of Zürich Sternen Grill (Switzerland)

Restaurant information
- Established: 1962
- Owner: Rosenberger family
- Manager(s): Peter Rosenberger; Thomas Rosenberger; Victor Stefenelli
- Location: Theaterstrasse 22, 8001 Zurich, Switzerland
- Coordinates: 47.3673°N 8.5455°E
- Website: www.sternengrill.ch

Sternen Grill is a restaurant in Zurich, Switzerland. Founded in 1962, it is located at the city's town square, Bellevueplatz. Sternen Grill is well known in the city for its sausages served with bread rolls, especially the St. Galler Bratwurst.

== History ==
The restaurant was founded by Edi Rosenberger in 1962. Victor Stefenelli, a member of the restaurant's management board, claims that Rosenberger invented the bratwurst in the city in 1963. In 2010, the building the restaurant was housed in was rebuilt, temporarily relocating Sternen Grill to Sechseläutenplatz until 2013. It also opened another location at Glattzentrum near Zurich in 2010. The new building had the same layout as the previous, but had more space for eating and was more modern.

== Menu ==
The main food sold by the restaurant is sausage. It is especially known for its St. Galler Bratwurst. Other sausages served include cervelat, pork bratwurst, salsiccia, and currywurst. Each is offered with a bread roll called bürli to make a sausage sandwich, which can include mustard. Additional food sold includes cordon bleu, fried zander, wiener schnitzel, veal liver, meatloaf, Leberkäse, Gehacktes mit Hörnli, Schweizer chicken, Älplermagronen, Spätzle, and mashed potatoes. Various salads are also served. For a short period of time in 2023, the restaurant worked with Hiltl Restaurant, also in Zurich, to sell vegetarian sausages.

The restaurant offers its food for dine-in or takeout, with another takeout location available at Zurich Airport.

== See also ==
- List of restaurants in Switzerland
