= William Perry Moore III =

American musician

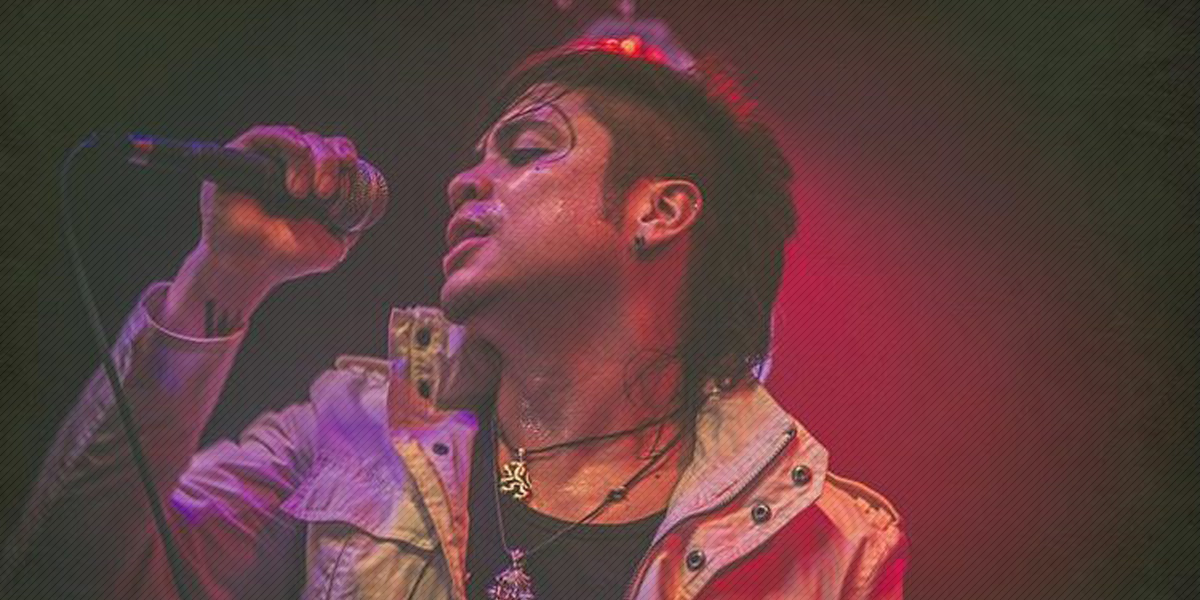

Background information
- Also known as: Will Moore
- Origin: Seattle, Washington, U.S.
- Genres: Hard rock, Rock, dance-rock, synthpop
- Occupations: Singer, musician, producer, educator, actor
- Instruments: Vocals, guitar, bass, synth
- Label: Soundgate
- Member of: The Adarna, Death by Overkill, Tinsel Town Mafia
- Formerly of: The Slants, Veritas
- Website: williamperrymoore.com

William Perry Moore is an American musician best known as the frontman for the Jet City Rock band The Adarna and as the former lead guitarist for The Slants. A dance-rock band composed entirely of Asian Americans.

== Early life and career ==
Moore is a military-brat born in Gainesville, Florida. Due to the nature of military life, Moore's family would often move every 1–3 years which would suit his life well as a touring musician. Moore completed a performing arts degree from Middlesex University and pursued acting which landed him his first major motion picture on "Mr. and Mrs. Smith" with Brad Pitt and Angelina Jolie in 2005. It was shortly after this that William began to pursue music full-time with his Los Angeles-based group, Veritas from 2004 to 2010. Veritas would tour nationally appearing at a host of venues and festivals including CMJ. To keep the band able to tour, Moore relocated to Seattle, Washington. Moore currently lives in Seattle working as a voice instructor, music mentor, and producer when he's not performing.

== The Adarna ==
In 2011, Moore created the Seattle-based band, The Adarna. In December 2015, The Adarna went overseas to entertain the US troops stationed in the Middle East and Southwest Asia which was sponsored by Armed Forces Entertainment. The Adarna performed at Rocklahoma 2017 alongside headliners Red Sun Rising, Fuel, Zakk Wylde, and Stone Sour. In May 2018, they appeared at Bratfest alongside Winger, Voodoo Fix, Shallow Side, and Bobaflex.

In March 2019, it was officially announced The Adarna would be joining Hinder for the Lucky 7 Tour alongside dates with Saving Abel, and American Sin.

It was announced that The Adarna would return to Brat Fest in May 2022 to perform alongside Royal Bliss and 38 Special.

== The Slants ==
Moore joined The Slants in 2012 as their lead guitarist. The Slants gained media notoriety during the band's Supreme Court legal battle with the Patent and Trademark Office over the usage of the name "The Slants." The Slants won their case and were featured on news outlets like NPR, Conan, The Daily Show, and the BBC. Moore stayed with the band until 2015 as an active member for a number of the group's national tours and appeared in several music videos. Moore later appeared on their Christmas 2020 Ramones' Cover of "I Don't Want to Fight Tonight." In 2023, Moore reunited with the members to perform on the album, "The Band Plays On." Currently, Moore serves on the Board of Directors for the nonprofit, Slants Foundation, which helps serve as a resource for emerging Asian American Artists

== Discography ==
- 2009: Veritas (Veritas) - "White Lies & Pretty Poisons"
- 2012: The Adarna (The Adarna) - "The Adarna" EP
- 2015: The Adarna (The Adarna) - "How Perceptive"
- 2015: The Adarna (The Adarna) - "Project Gratitude"
- 2018: The Adarna (The Adarna) - "Road to Resonance"
- 2019: Death by Overkill (Death by Overkill) - "Hold My Beer, Son"
- 2023: The Slants (The Slants) – "The Band Plays On"
- 2024: Death by Overkill (Death by Overkill) - "Come At Me, Bro"
