= Twigs Boutique =

American boutique

Twigs Boutique is an independent women's fashion boutique located in Madison, Wisconsin at the Hilldale Shopping Center. Founder Jen Van Wart established the boutique in 2002 after relocating to Wisconsin from New York.

In 2012, Elle Magazine recognized Twigs as one of the best boutiques in America.

== Brands ==
Twigs represents fashion designers in apparel, handbags, and jewelry. Designers include Tory Burch, Rag & Bone, Citizens of Humanity, Marc Jacobs, Tibi, Chan Luu, Canada Goose, and many more.
