= Gamehole Con =

Annual tabletop gaming convention

- Genre: Tabletop gaming
- Venue: Alliant Energy Center
- Locations: Madison, Wisconsin, United States
- Inaugurated: 2013
- Website: www.gameholecon.com

Gamehole Con is an annual tabletop gaming convention held in Madison, Wisconsin. The convention includes role-playing games, board games, collectible card games, live-action role-playing, and an exhibitor area. It is held at the Alliant Energy Center.

== History ==
Gamehole Con was established in 2013 by a group of Madison-area gamers. Its first event, held at a local hotel, attracted 430 attendees. Attendance nearly doubled in its second year, after which the convention moved to the Alliant Energy Center. The 2020 convention was cancelled; by 2019, it had registered nearly 5,000 attendees.

In 2024, approximately 5,500 people attended the convention. ICv2 reported attendance of more than 6,000 in 2025.

== Programming ==
The convention's programming includes tabletop role-playing games, board games, collectible card games, miniature gaming, and live-action role-playing. It also features an exhibitor hall and special guests from the tabletop gaming industry.
