= Ben Lamb =

Ben or Benjamin Lamb may refer to:

- Ben Lamb (actor) (born 1989), English actor
- Ben Lamb (poker player) (born 1985), American poker player
- Benjamin Lamb (fl. 1715), English organist

== See also ==
- Ben Lam (disambiguation)
- Benjamin G. Lamme (1864–1924), American electrical engineer
