= Adarna =

Adarna may refer to:

- Ibong Adarna or Adarna bird, a legendary bird and an epic poem of the Philippines
- Ibong Adarna (1941 film), a Filipino film
- Adarna: The Mythical Bird, a 1997 Filipino lost animated film
- Adarna (TV series), a Filipino TV series
- Adarna House, a Filipino book publishing company
- Ellen Adarna (born 1988), Filipino actress
- The Adarna, an American rock band from Seattle, Washington
