= Ben Lam =

Ben Lam may refer to:

- Ben Lam (rugby) (born 1991), New Zealand rugby player
- Ben Lam (politician) (born 1991), Hong Kong politician and film critic

== See also ==
- Ben Lamb (disambiguation)
- Benjamin G. Lamme (1864–1924), American electrical engineer
