= Brat Fest =

Annual fundraiser in Madison, Winconsin

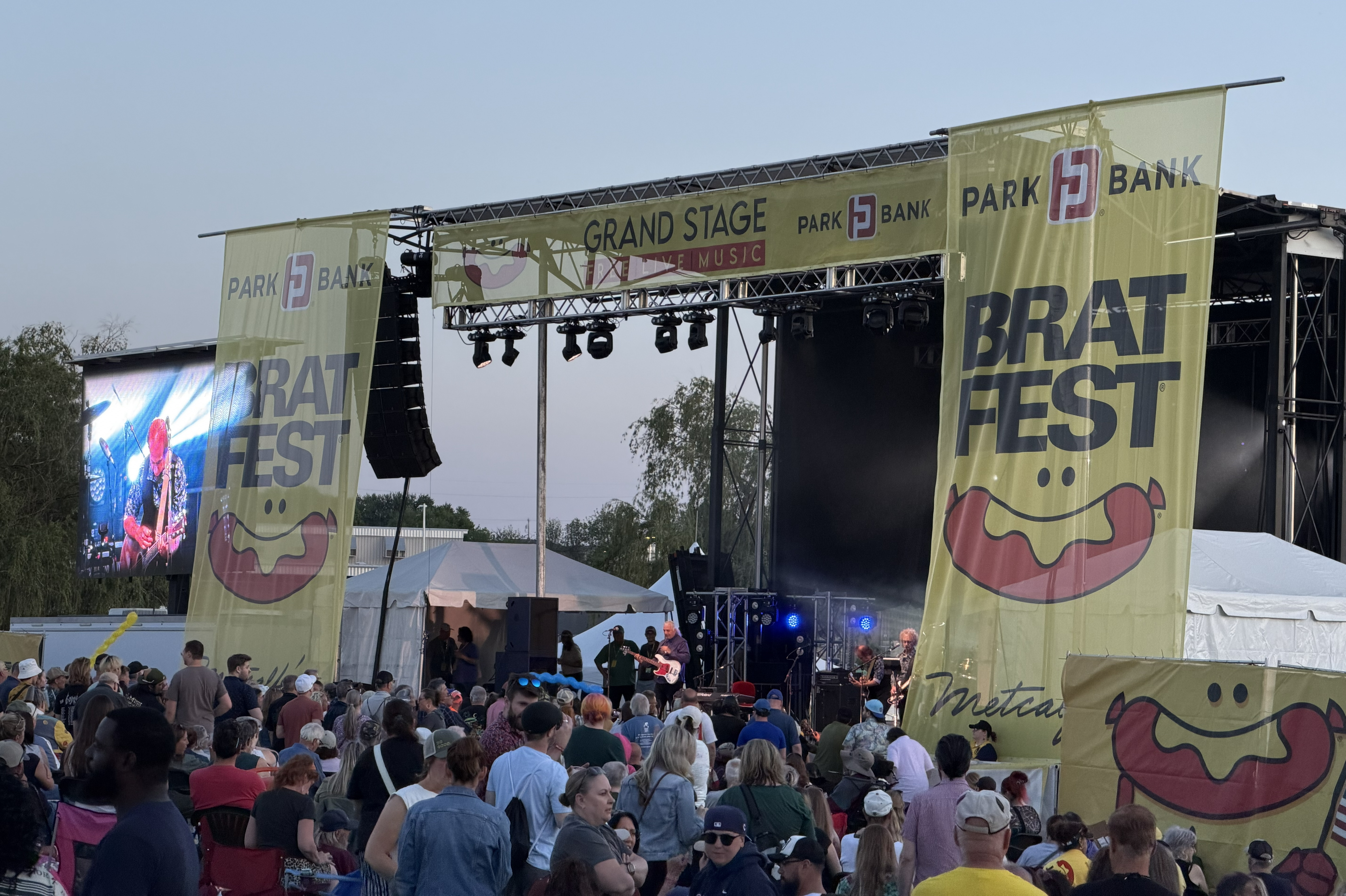
- Grand Stage at 2026 Brat Fest
- Frequency: Annually
- Locations: Alliant Energy Center; Madison, Wisconsin
- Coordinates: 43°2′46″N 89°22′43.64″W
- Country: United States
- Years active: 43
- Leader: Tim Metcalfe
- Sponsor: Johnsonville Foods
- Website: bratfest.com

Brat Fest, which bills itself as "World's Largest Brat Fest", is an annual fundraiser held in Madison, Wisconsin.

The event has been held every Memorial Day weekend since 1983, when it was launched by Tom Metcalfe, an area businessman who owned the Hilldale Mall location of Sentry Foods in Madison. Initially held in the parking lot in front of the Metcalfe's Sentry store, the event was intended as a customer appreciation event for those who shopped there, but soon evolved into a fundraiser for local charities. Bratwurst, hot dogs, and soft drinks are served at the festival. Tom Metcalfe's sons, Tim and Kevin, are now coordinators for the event.

== Overview ==
In the early years of the event, Brat Fest was held over both the Memorial Day and Labor Day weekends. After the move to the Willow Island site, organizers decided to hold the event only on Memorial Day weekend, to minimize expenses. Many non-profit groups donate grillers and servers. Local celebrities and politicians volunteer time as servers during the event. Past servers have included Wisconsin Governor Jim Doyle and Senator Tammy Baldwin.

In 2005, Brat Fest was relocated from its Hilldale Shopping Center location, which had grown too small for the crowds, to Willow Island at the Alliant Energy Center. In 2006, two filmmakers, Benjamin Lamb and Vernon Johnson, created a documentary film honoring Brat Fest. Released on July 15, 2006, the film contained interviews with Governor Jim Doyle, Brat Fest Organizer Tim Metcalfe, Kevin Metcalfe and the wife of Tom Metcalfe.

In 2009, 208,752 brats were consumed, which is believed to be a world record for single festival over a four-day period. In 2010, Brat Fest set a new "self-proclaimed" world record by selling 209,376 brats during the four-day festival.

In 2011, the festival was chosen by Parade magazine as one of the top 50 festivals in the U.S. During the 2011 Wisconsin protests, it was made public that the main sponsor of festival, Johnsonville Foods, made contributions towards the election of the Republican Governor Scott Walker. This led to calls to boycott the festival, as well as the formation of several small left-wing alternative events.

In 2012, Brat Fest was again recognized by Parade magazine as one of the top festivals in the U.S. In 2015, Brat Fest featured four music stages with 100 bands performing, including Charlie Daniels Band and Bret Michaels.

In 2020, the Brat Fest was canceled with officials citing the COVID-19 pandemic as grounds for cancellation.
