= Sundance Group =

Corporation run by Robert Redford

In 1969, Robert Redford purchased 6,000 acres (24 km^{2}) at the base of 12,000-foot (3,700 m) Mount Timpanogos in Utah's Wasatch Mountains. He named this land Sundance (after his character in the 1969 film Butch Cassidy and the Sundance Kid). The Sundance Group is a listing of all the businesses that run under the Sundance corporate umbrella started by and run by actor Robert Redford.

== Institute ==
The Sundance Institute is a non-profit organization founded in 1981. Through its programs, the Institute seeks to discover, support, and inspire independent film and theatre artists from the United States and around the world, and to introduce audiences to their new work.

== Film festival ==
The Sundance Film Festival is a film festival in the United States that began in 1985 and ranks alongside the Cannes, Venice, Berlin and Toronto film festivals as one of the most prestigious in the world. It is the largest independent cinema festival in the US. Held in January in Park City, Salt Lake City, and Ogden, Utah as well as at the Sundance Resort, the festival is the premier showcase for new work from American and international independent filmmakers. The festival comprises competitive sections for American and international dramatic and documentary films, and a group of non-competitive showcase sections, including the Sundance Online Film Festival.

== Catalog ==
In the Sundance Resort was a tiny store which guests would frequently write to, requesting special items they had seen while visiting Sundance. Twenty years had passed since the beginning of Sundance and requests for the store's unique offerings spread beyond the box canyon. People who had visited Sundance began to write back to the store from all over the country. Robert Redford called together a few of his colleagues to discuss starting a mail-order catalog to fill these requests and to make Sundance's unique items available to a wider audience. It started small, four employees, Harry Rosenthal and Brent Beck as CEO and VP Merchant, working from the old Sundance Village firehouse put together the first Sundance Catalog, which mailed in the fall of 1989 to a relatively small group of general store customers and friends.

The Sundance Catalog is now issued seasonally, and has been augmented by a separate jewelry catalog. The Sundance Catalog Company, based in West Valley City, Utah, has since grown to reach an international clientele. Catalog offerings are also offered at “Sundance the Store”, retail outlets in Corte Madera, California, Lone Tree, Colorado, and Salt Lake City, Utah.

== TV ==
SundanceTV was launched in 1996 as Sundance Channel and is a venture of AMC Networks and Redford. SundanceTV offers viewers films, documentaries, and original programs. SundanceTV operates independently of the non-profit Sundance Institute and the Sundance Film Festival, but shares the overall Sundance mission of encouraging artistic freedom of expression.

== Film distribution ==
Sundance Selects is a label of AMC Networks' IFC Films specializing in foreign films and documentaries for theatrical release in North America.

== Cinemas ==
Sundance Cinemas LLC was a movie theatre chain founded by Robert Redford's Sundance Group that aimed to showcase independent, documentary and foreign-language films as well as some studio projects. Its headquarters was in Westlake Village, California.

The first cinema, Sundance 608, opened May 11, 2007 at the Hilldale Shopping Center in Madison, Wisconsin, and contained six stadium-seated auditoriums, along with a cafe, bistro, bar, rooftop bar, and Gallery 608, which sold local and Sundance-related arts and merchandise. A second cinema, the Sundance Kabuki located in Japantown in San Francisco, California, re-opened on December 14, 2007, after being an AMC theater. Sundance Cinema's third theater, Sundance Cinemas Houston, was located within the Bayou Place development in downtown Houston, Texas. The new 8-screen theater opened in November 2011 after a $2.25 million renovation. Additional locations opened in West Hollywood in 2012 and Seattle in 2013.

On October 6, 2015, it was announced that Carmike Cinemas had acquired Sundance Cinemas for $36 million. In 2016, Carmike was purchased by AMC Theatres, who proceeded to phase out the Sundance Cinemas name by converting all locations into the AMC Dine-In brand the following year.

=== AMC Madison 6 ===
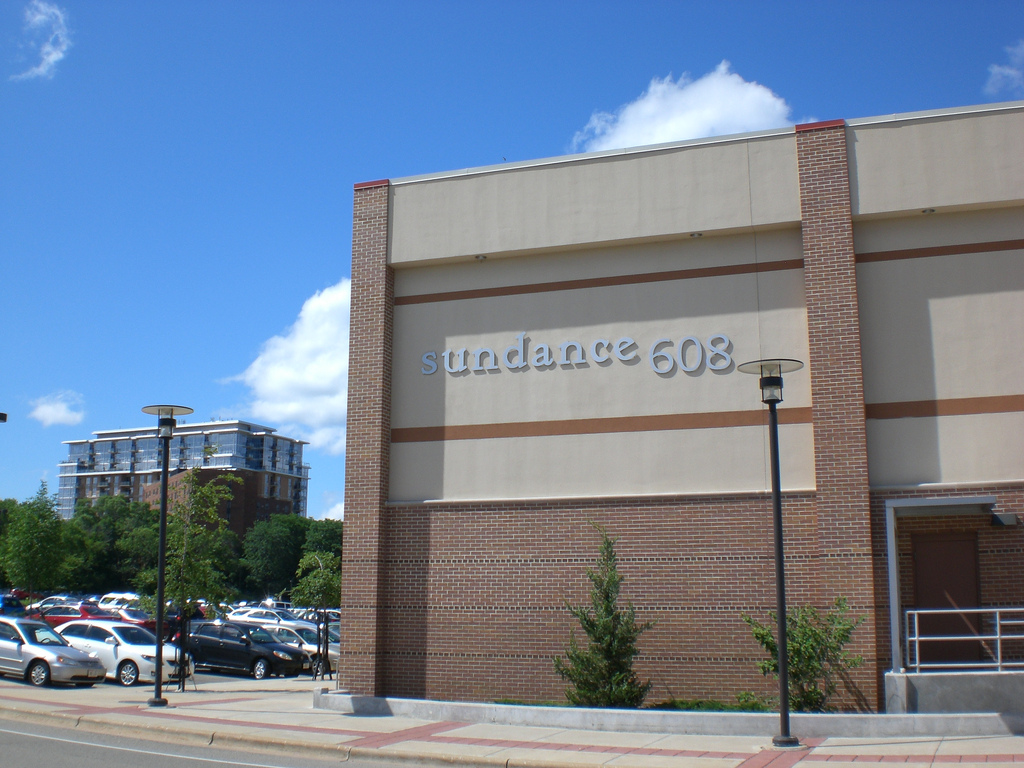

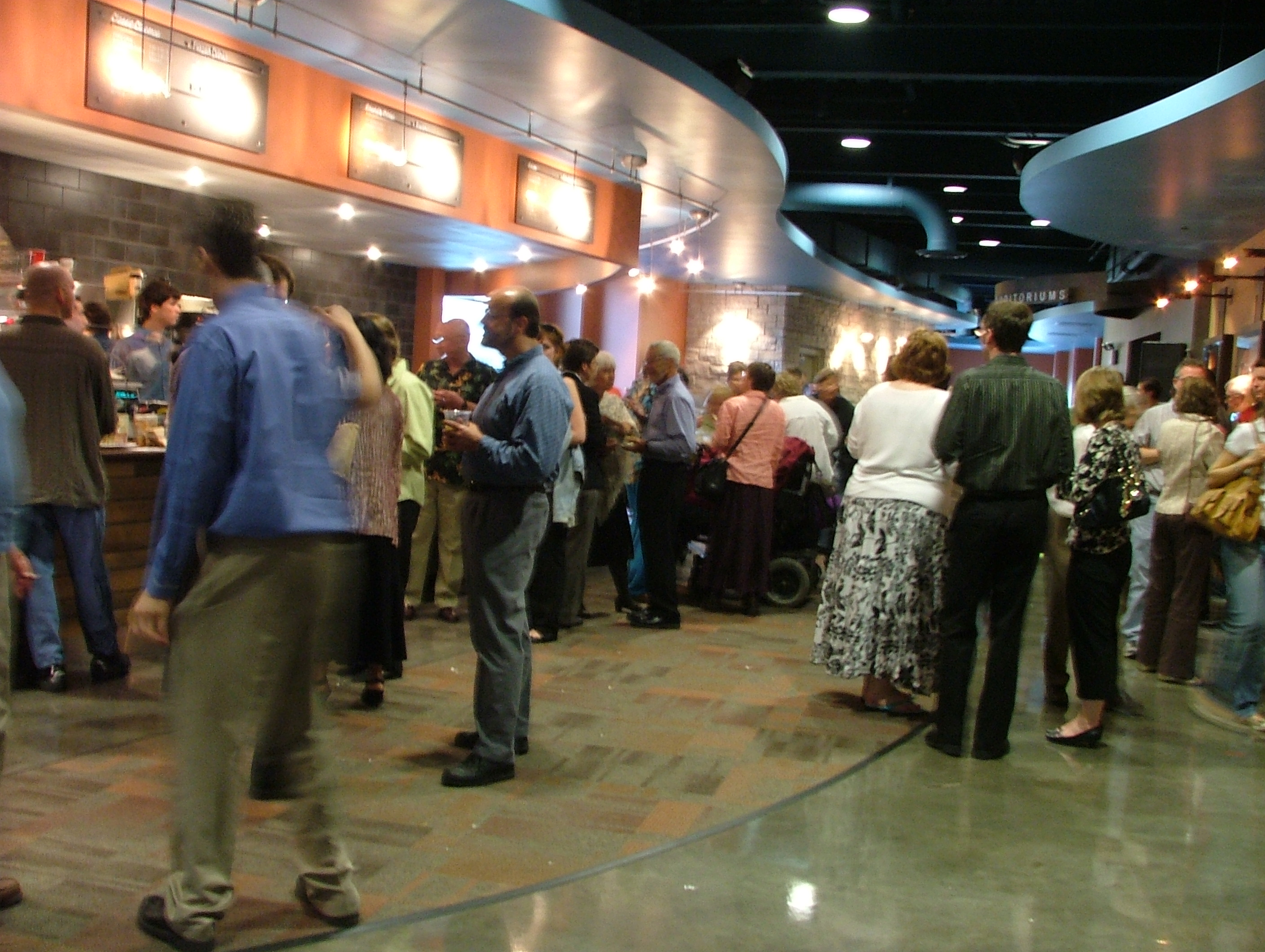

AMC Madison 6 is a movie theater in Madison, Wisconsin owned by AMC Theatres. Originally the first of the Sundance Cinemas in the United States, the theater opened as the Sundance 608 on May 11, 2007. The theater is located in the Hilldale Shopping Center, where it replaced the Hilldale Theater. The "608" was a reference to the telephone area code for the region. Madison was selected as the first location for Sundance Cinemas because of the level of interest in independent film in the region. Sundance Cinemas was purchased by Carmike Cinemas in 2015. In 2016, Carmike was purchased by AMC Theatres, who converted the theater to the AMC Dine-In brand the following year. AMC Madison 6 contains six stadium-seated auditoriums, a cafe, and a MacGuffins rooftop bar.

== See also ==
Sun Dance
