= The Adarna =

American band

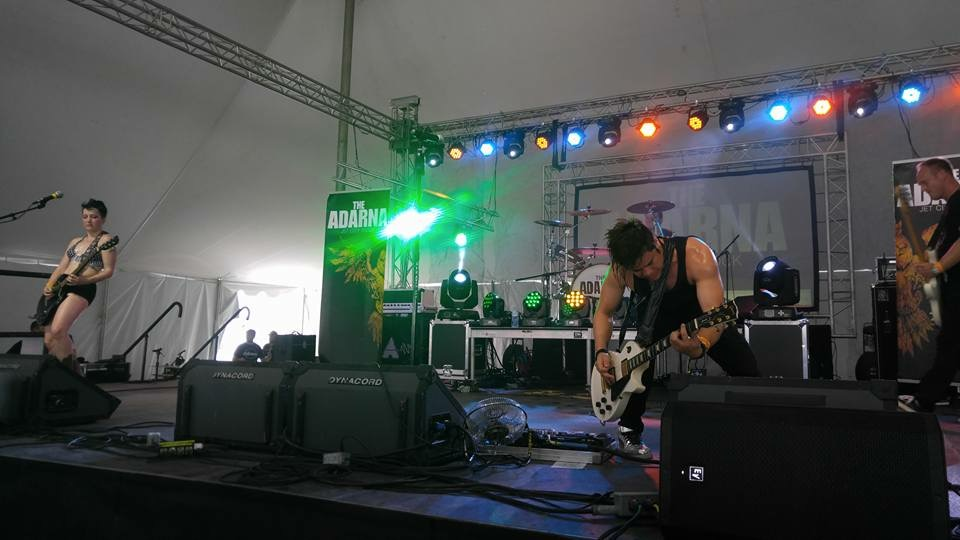
- The Adarna performing at Rocklahoma 2017

Background information
- Also known as: Adarna
- Origin: Seattle, Washington, U.S.
- Genres: Rock, hard rock, Jet City rock
- Years active: 2010–present
- Labels: Soundgate
- Members: William Perry Moore; Oliver Spencer; Murdock
- Past members: Andreka Jasek; Jeremiah Hazel; Jake "Ian Lord
- Website: theadarna.com

The Adarna is an American band formed in Seattle, Washington, in 2010. They are the first band that coined their genre of "Jet City Rock". The band derives their name from the Filipino story of Ibong Adarna. The group was founded by lead singer William Perry Moore, lead guitarist Andreka Jasek, bassist Jeremiah Hazel, and drummer Murdock.

== Touring ==
In December 2015, The Adarna went overseas to entertain the US troops stationed in the Middle East and Southwest Asia which was sponsored by Armed Forces Entertainment. The Adarna performed at Rocklahoma 2017 alongside headliners Red Sun Rising, Fuel, Zakk Wylde, and Stone Sour. In May 2018, they appeared at Bratfest alongside Winger, Voodoo Fix, Shallow Side, and Bobaflex.

In March 2019, it was officially announced The Adarna would be joining Hinder for the Lucky 7 Tour alongside dates with Saving Abel, and American Sin.

It was announced that The Adarna would return to Brat Fest in May 2022 to perform alongside Royal Bliss and 38 Special.

== Discography ==
- The Adarna (self-titled) (2012)
- How Perceptive (2015)
- Road to Resonance (2018)
