= Bratwurst =

Type of sausage

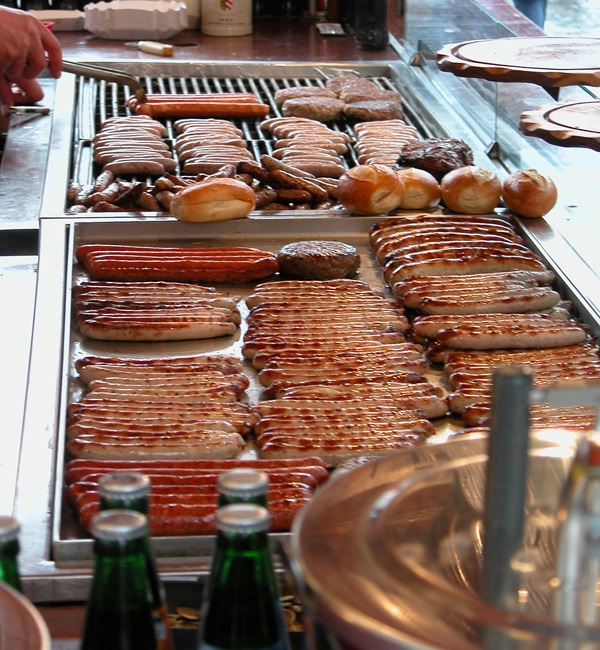
- A variety of Bratwürste on a stand at the Hauptmarkt in Nuremberg, Bavaria, Germany
- Type: Sausage
- Course: Main
- Place of origin: Germany
- Region or state: Nuremberg
- Main ingredients: Meat (pork, beef, veal or chicken)

Bratwurst (German: [ˈbʁaːtvʊʁst]) is a type of German sausage made from pork or, less commonly, beef, veal, or any combination of beef, veal, and pork. The name is derived from the Old High German Brätwurst, from brät-, finely chopped meat, and Wurst, sausage, although in modern German it is often associated with the verb braten, to pan fry or roast.

== History ==
The first documented evidence of the Bratwurst in Germany dates to 1313 in the Franconian city of Nuremberg, which is still internationally renowned for the production of grilling sausages.

== Types and traditions ==
=== Germany ===
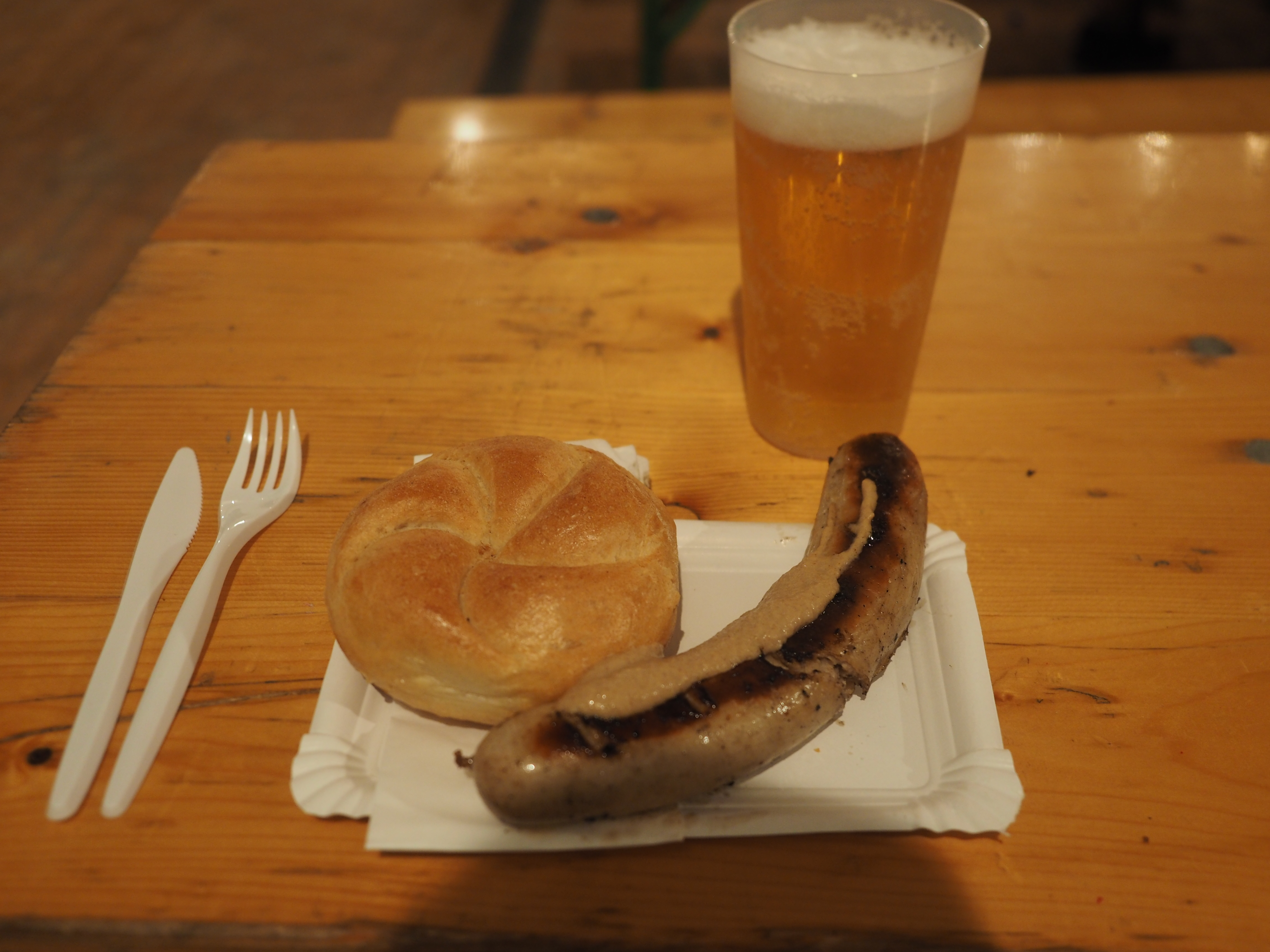
Bratwurst, a bread roll, and beer, served in Hohenems, Vorarlberg, Austria

In Germany, a bratwurst is considered genuine if its main ingredient is pork. Recipes for the sausage vary by region and even locality; some sources list over 40 different varieties of German Bratwurst, many of the best known originating in Franconia (today for the most part situated in northern Bavaria, but still culturally quite distinct), its northern neighbor Thuringia and adjacent areas. How the sausages are served is also locally different, but most commonly they are regarded as a simple snack served with or in a white bread roll made from wheat flour and eaten with mustard. As a pub dish, it is often accompanied by sauerkraut or potato salad and sometimes served with dark, crusty country bread made predominantly from rye flour, or less commonly with a Brezel (pretzel). It is a very popular form of fast food in German-speaking countries, often cooked and sold by street vendors from small stands, and is also traditionally popular with fans at football games.

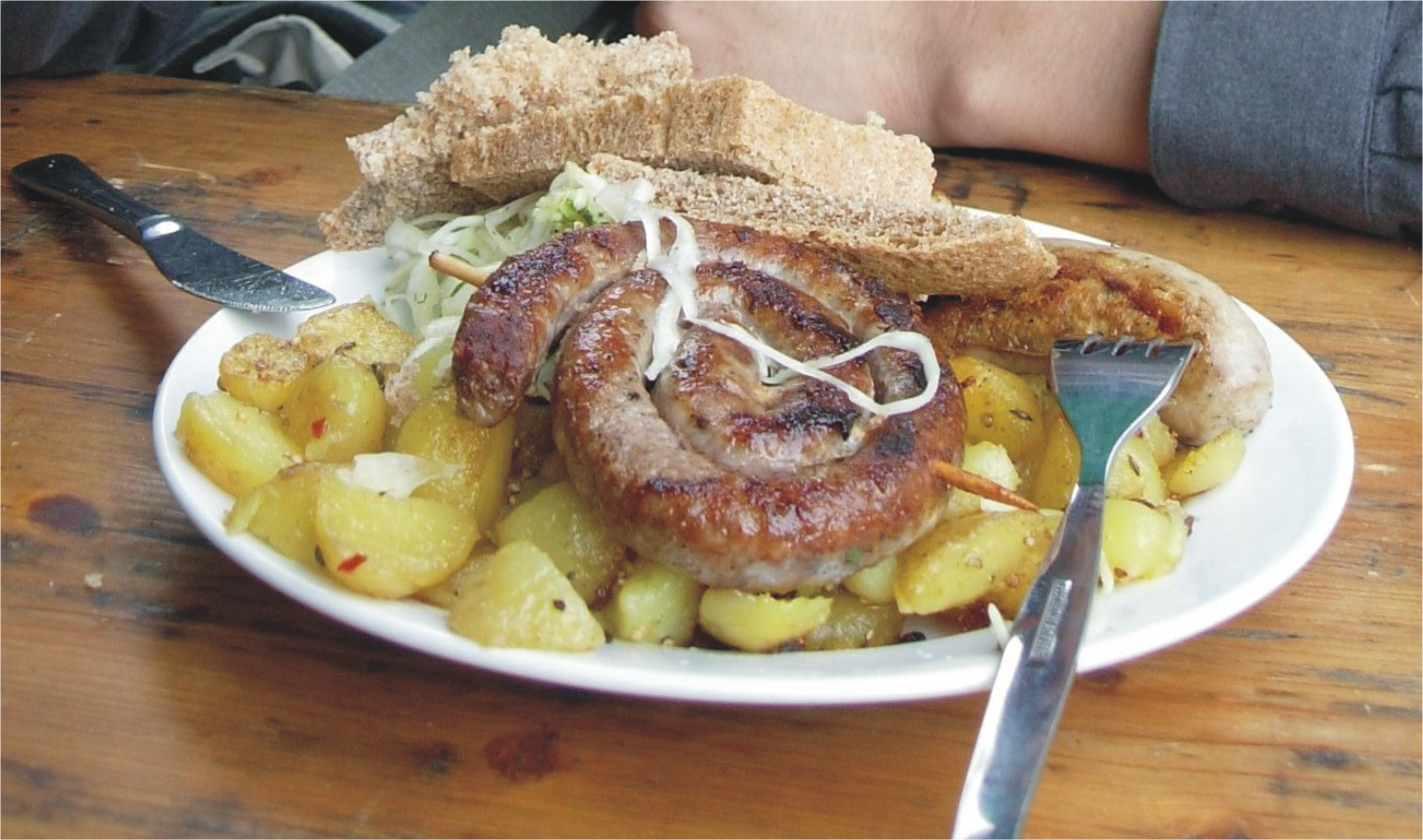
Bratwurst as traditional German fast food in Münster

==== Franconian varieties ====
===== Fränkische Bratwurst =====
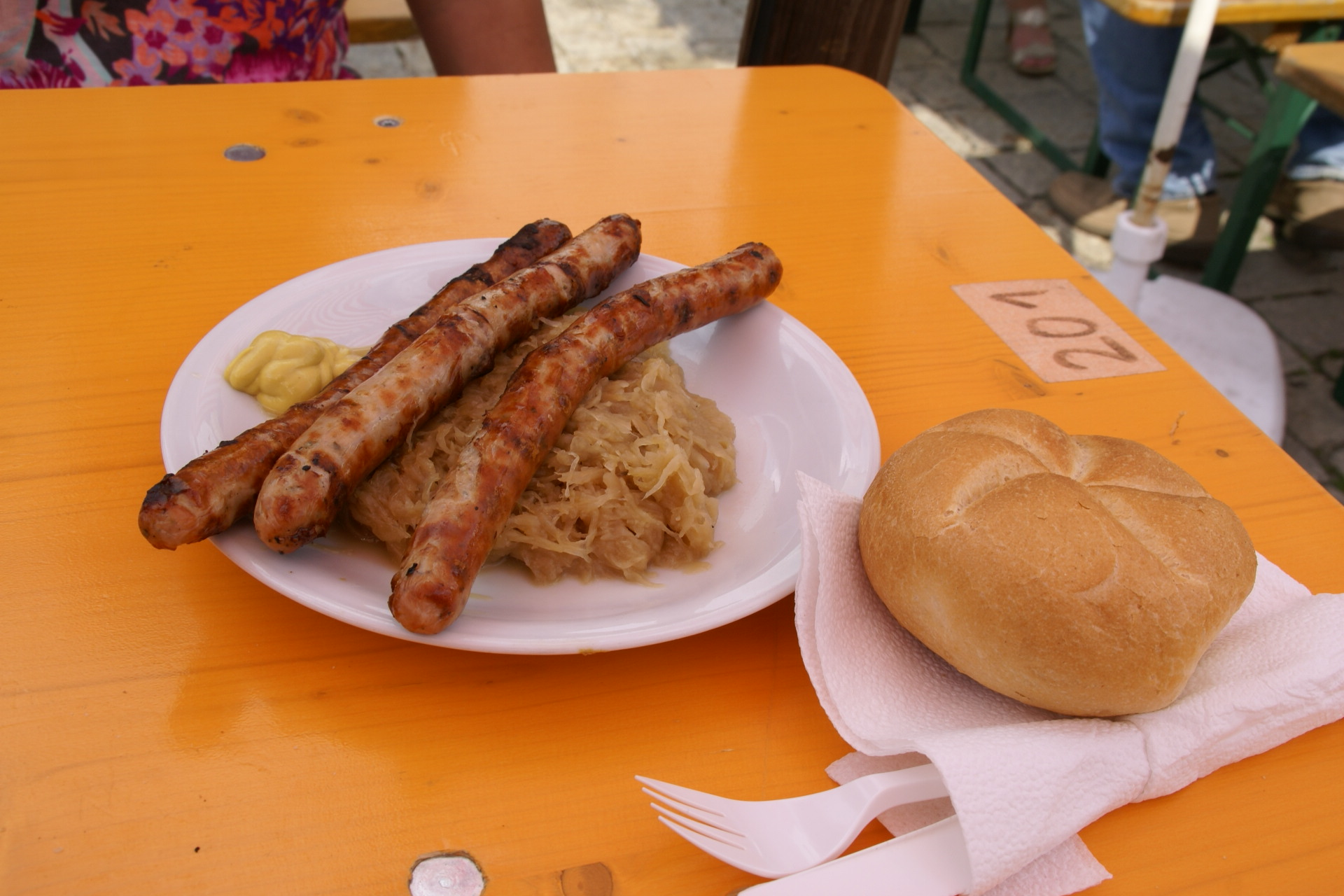
Fränkische Bratwurst

The Franconian sausage is a relatively long (10–20 cm [4–8 in]), thick, coarse sausage, common to the whole Franconian region with slight variations. It dates back to 1313. With marjoram as a characteristic ingredient, it is close in taste to the Nürnberger Bratwurst but juicier, due to its size and coarseness. The Fränkische Bratwurst is traditionally served with sauerkraut or potato salad.

===== Coburger Bratwurst =====
Bratwurst originating in the city of Coburg in Franconia was first documented there in 1498. It is made from pork and a minimum of 15% beef, seasoned with only salt, pepper, nutmeg, and lemon zest, and bound with raw egg. It is coarse in texture and is about 25 cm (10 in) long. Traditionally, it is grilled over pinecones and served in a bread roll (Brötchen).

===== Kulmbacher Bratwurst =====
The Kulmbacher Bratwurst is a finely-ground Rohwurst from the city of Kulmbach in Upper Franconia. Long and thin, it is made mostly from very finely ground veal, with very little pork. This sausage may be seasoned with salt, white pepper, nutmeg, lemon peel, marjoram, caraway, and garlic. The exact mixture is a closely guarded trade secret of each butcher. Kulmbacher Bratwurst is usually pan-fried, or grilled over a wood fire. They are sold and served freshly grilled from vendors' stands in the Marktplatz, in pairs, with or without mustard, on crusty rolls sprinkled with anise.

===== Nürnberger Rostbratwurst =====
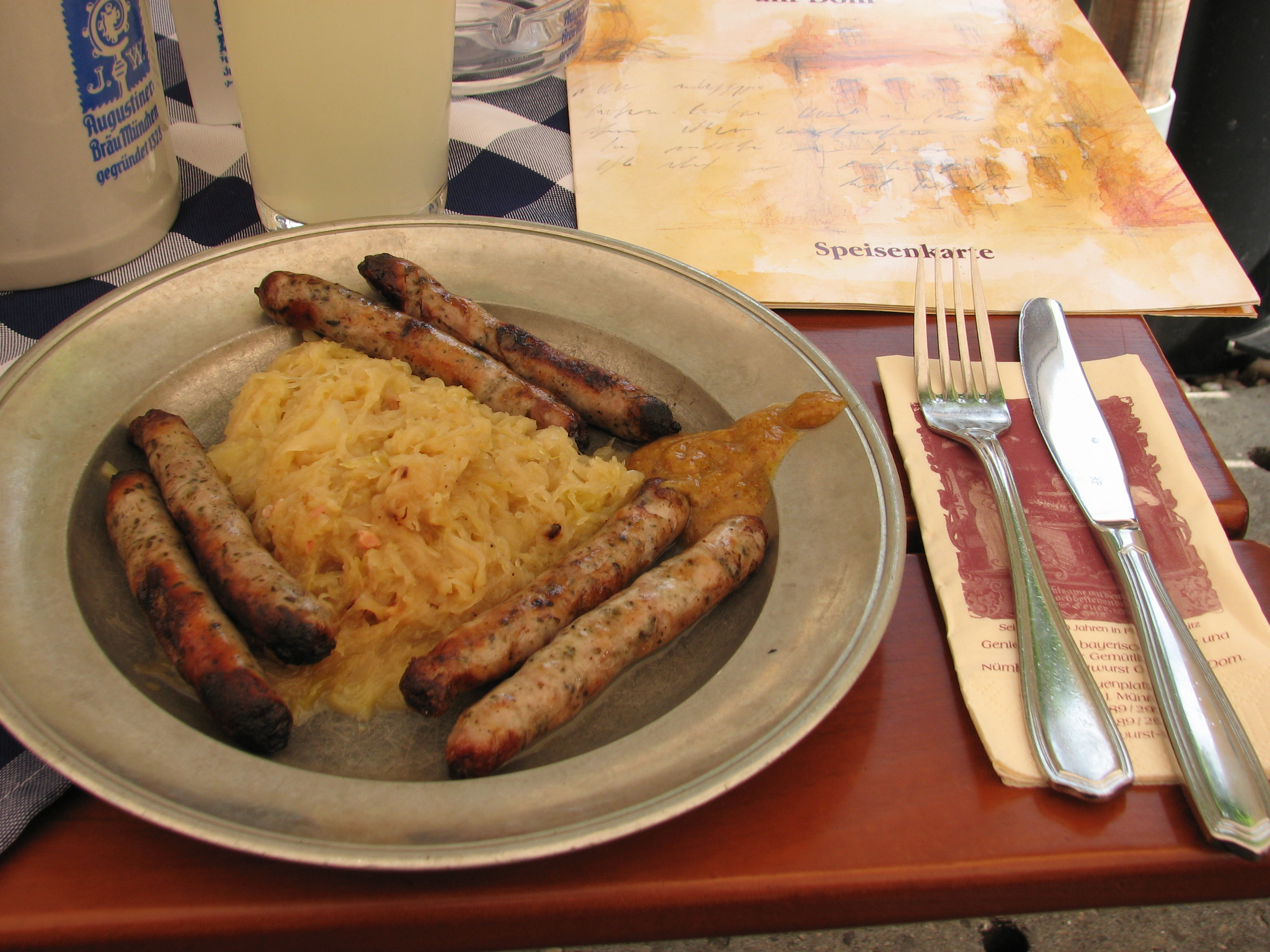
Nürnberger Bratwurst with sauerkraut and mustard, as served in the Nürnberger Bratwurst Glöckl in Munich

The small, thin bratwurst from Franconia's largest city, Nuremberg, was first documented in 1567; it is 7 to 9 cm (2.8 to 3.5 in) long, and weighs between 20 and 25 g. The denominations Nürnberger Bratwurst and Nürnberger Rostbratwurst (Rost comes from the grill above the cooking fire) are Protected Geographical Indications (PGI) under EU law since 2003, and may therefore only be produced in the city of Nürnberg, where an "Association for the Protection of Nürnberger Bratwürste" was established in 1997.

Pork-based and typically seasoned with fresh marjoram which gives them their distinctive flavour, these sausages are traditionally grilled over a beechwood fire. As a main dish six sausages are served on a pewter plate with either sauerkraut or potato salad, and accompanied by a dollop of horseradish or mustard. They are also sold as a snack by street vendors as Drei im Weckla (three in a bun; the spelling Drei im Weggla is also common, Weggla/Weckla being the word for "bread roll" in the Nuremberg dialect), with mustard.

Another way of cooking Nuremberg sausages is in a spiced vinegar and onion stock; this is called Blaue Zipfel (blue lobes).

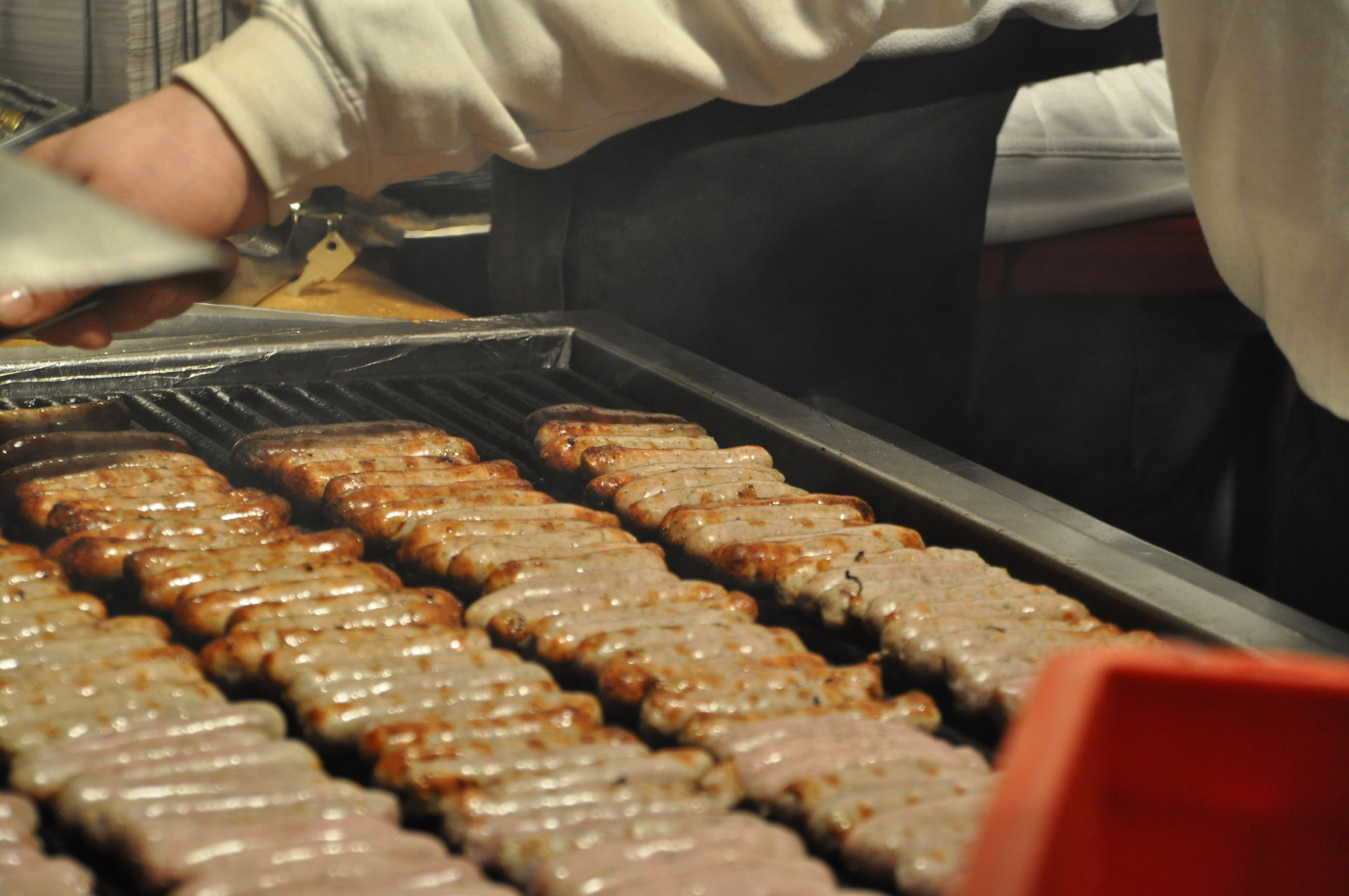
Nürnberger Rostbratwurst

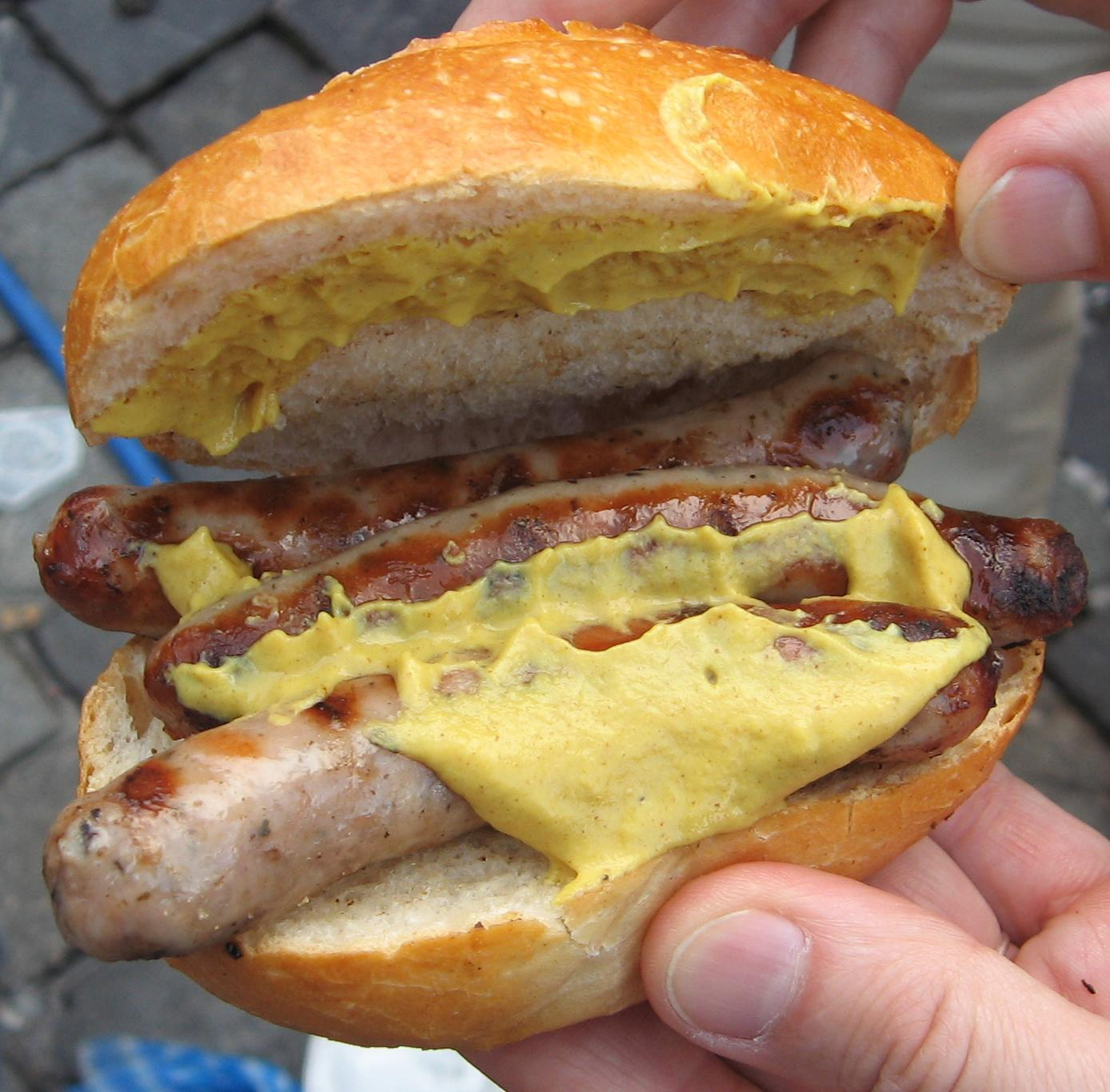
Drei im Weggla

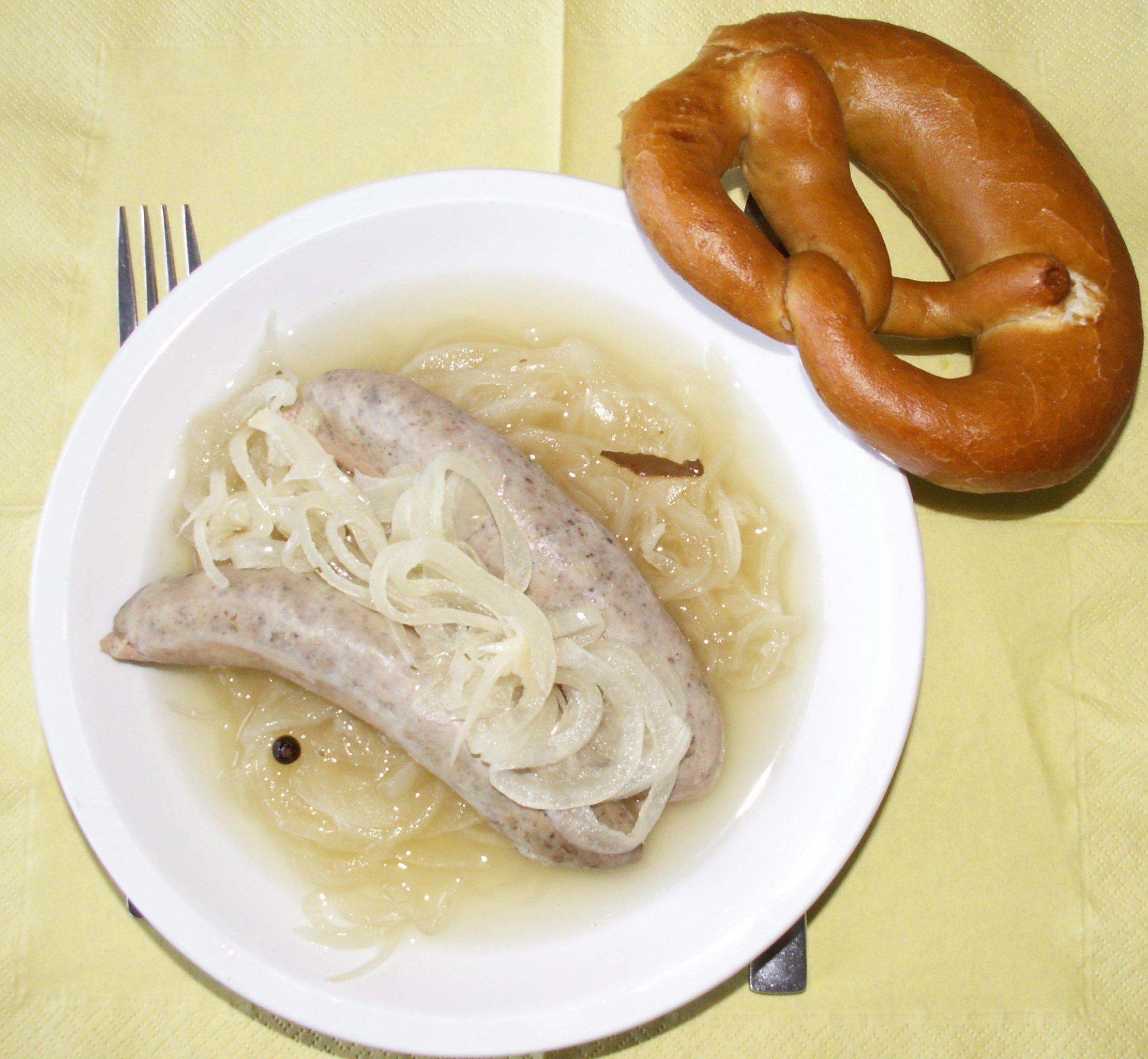
Blaue Zipfel mit Brezel

===== Würzburger Bratwurst =====
The Würzburger Bratwurst, also known as the Winzerbratwurst, comes from the city of Würzburg in Franconia. Its size is similar to the Thüringer Rostbratwurst, but its ingredients include white wine from the region.

==== Other varieties ====
===== Thüringer Rostbratwurst =====
Bratwurst on Schwenker

The Thüringer Rostbratwurst is a thin, 15–20 cm (6–8 in) long spiced sausage from Thuringia. It is notable for its low fat content (25% as compared to up to 60% in other sausages). In addition to salt and pepper, caraway, marjoram, and garlic are used for spicing. It is traditionally grilled over a charcoal fire and eaten with mustard and bread.

The name Thüringer Rostbratwurst is recognized as a protected geographical indication (PGI) under EU law.

Triggered by the discovery in 2000 of an account entry of 1404 first mentioning the Bratwurst in Thuringia in the town of Arnstadt, the association "Friends of the Thuringian Bratwurst" was founded in 2006. In the same year, the association established the Erstes Deutsches Bratwurstmuseum (transl. First German Bratwurst Museum) in the village of Holzhausen.

In 2016, a kosher version of Thuringian bratwurst made with veal and chicken packed into goat intestines was introduced at the annual Onion Festival in Weimar.

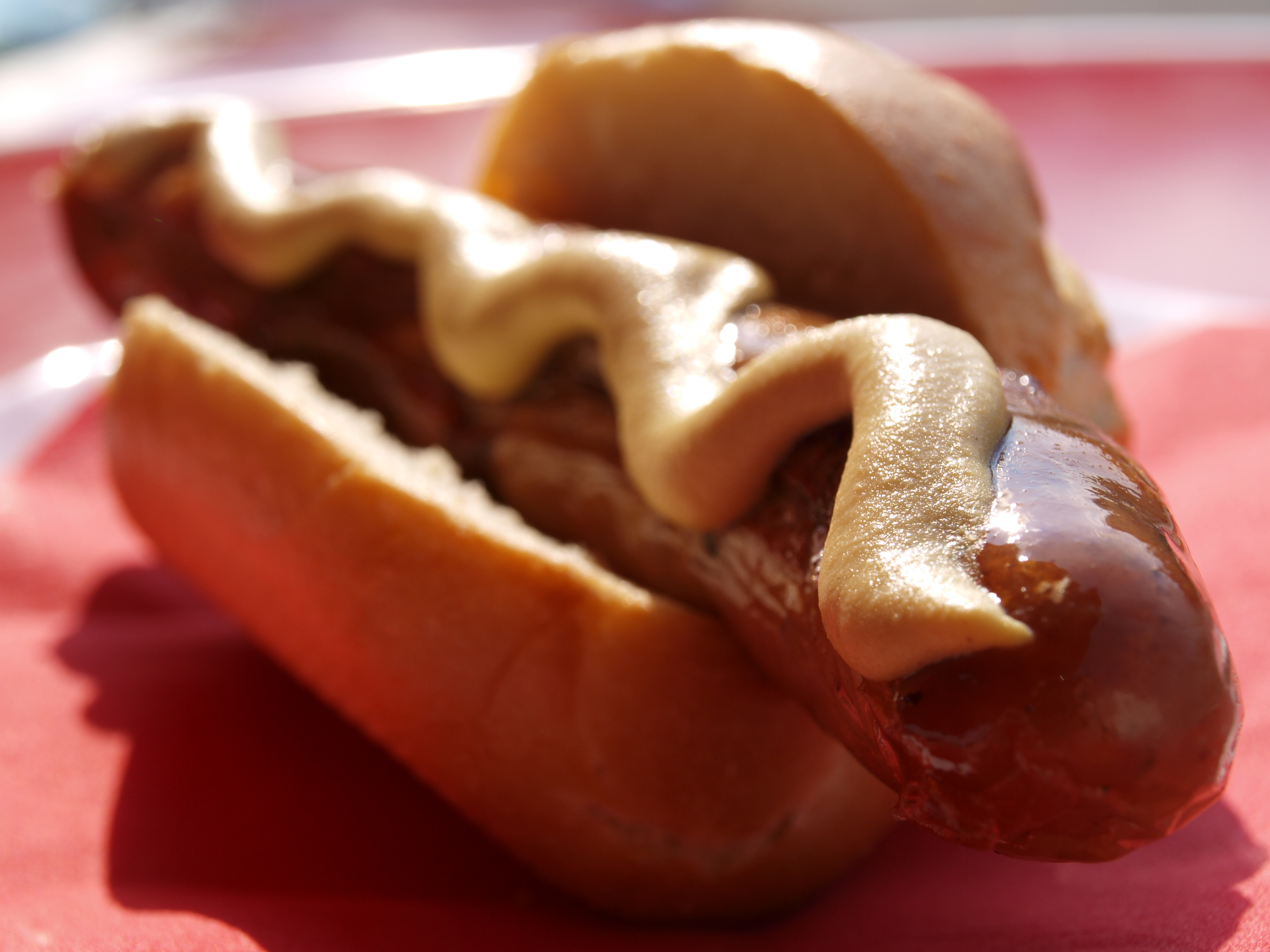
Thüringer Rostbratwurst in a bun with mustard

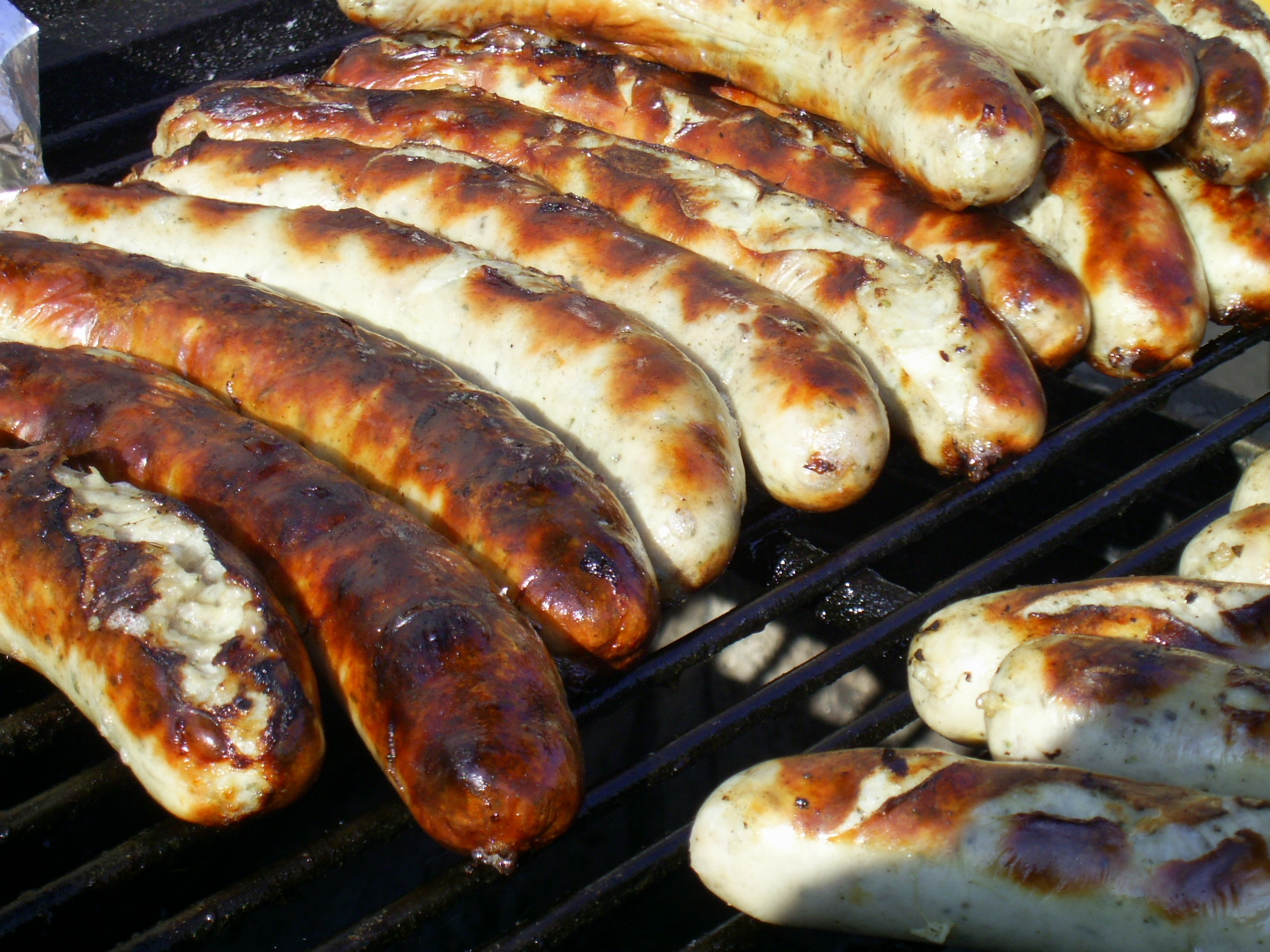
Close-up of Thüringer Rostbratwurst

===== Nordhessische Bratwurst =====
The 20 cm (8 in)-long Nordhessische Bratwurst (from northern Hessen) is similar to the Thüringer Rostbratwurst in taste. It is made from coarsely ground pork and is heavily seasoned. Traditionally, it is grilled over a wood fire and served on a cut-open roll with mustard.

===== Rote Wurst =====
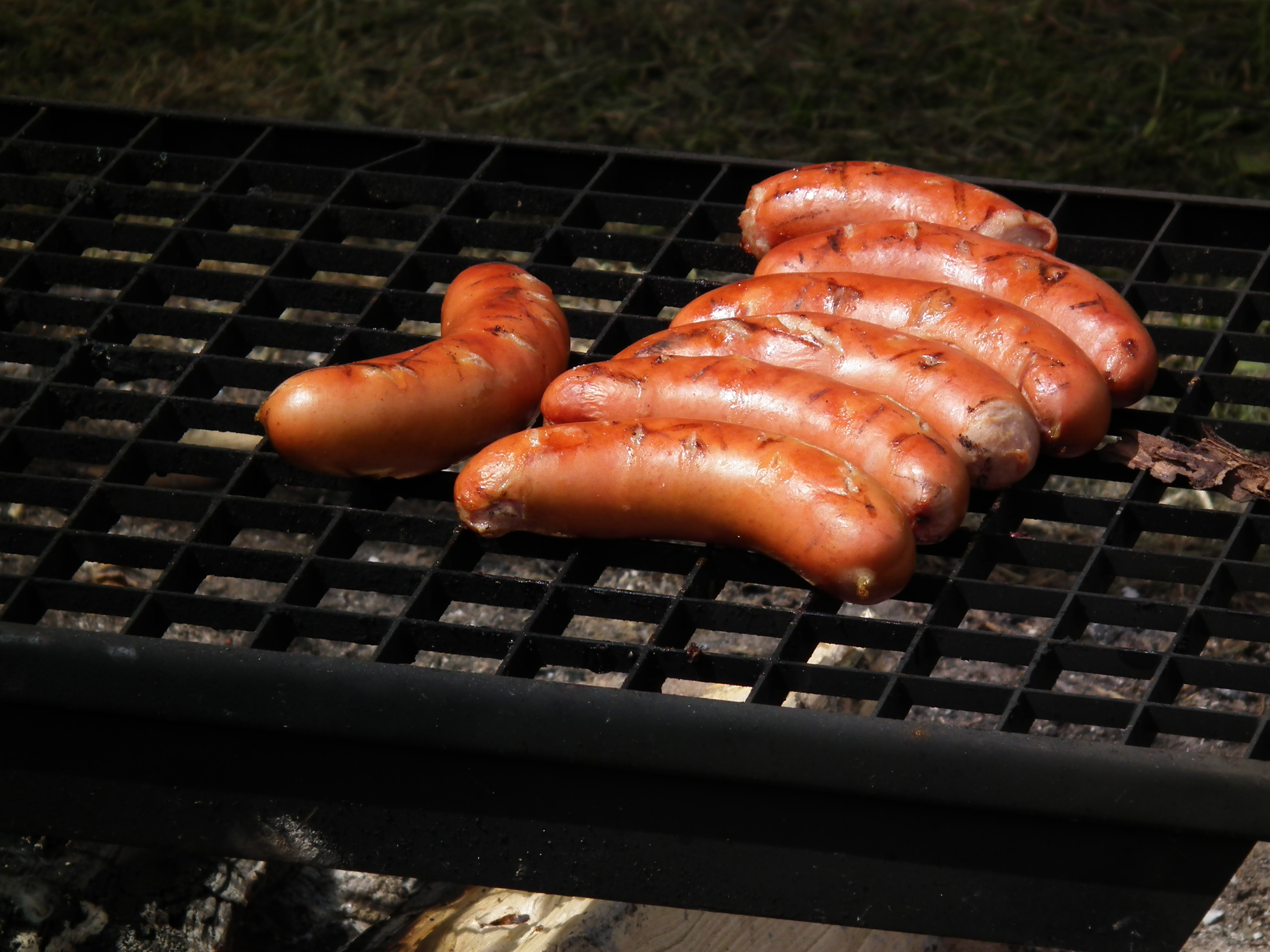
Rote Wurst

The Rote Wurst (red sausage) is a favorite Bratwurst of the Swabian region. It is similar to the Bockwurst, and is made from finely ground pork and bacon, and has a spicy taste. To prevent splitting during grilling or pan frying, an X is cut into the ends of the sausage, which opens during cooking. Sometimes a row of x-shaped cuts are made along its length.

===== Banater Bratwurst =====
Banat Swabians, Danube Swabians living in the Banat, brought both fresh and smoked Banater Bratwurst with them when they immigrated to Germany. Influenced by the Banat region's cuisine, it is made with hot and sweet paprika.

=== Switzerland ===
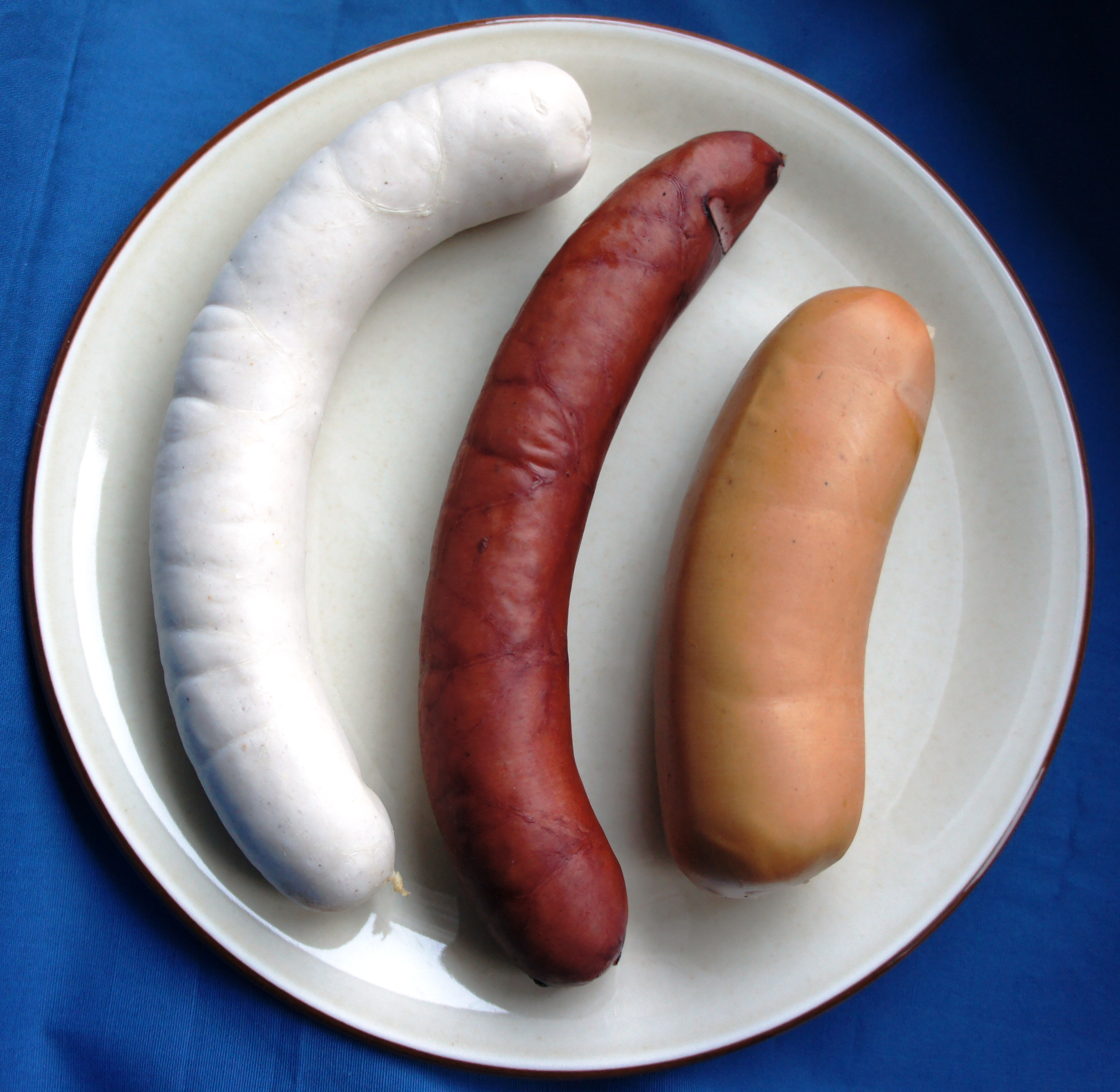
Cooked St. Galler bratwurst (left), schüblig (center), cervelas (right)

In 1438, bratwurst started to become popular in eastern Switzerland, especially in St. Gallen. "St. Galler Bratwurst", traditionally made from veal, has been famous since then. St. Galler bratwurst with a round bread is sold on the street, and also served in restaurants with rösti.

=== United States ===
Bratwurst, often shortened to "brat" in American English, is a common type of sausage in the United States, especially in the Upper Midwestern region, which is home to many people of German-American ethnicity. Wisconsin, where the largest ancestry group is German, is known for its bratwursts. Brats are also popular in other Midwestern states such as Michigan, Minnesota, Missouri, Ohio, Indiana, and Iowa, as well as cities with large populations like New York, Chicago, and Philadelphia. Originally brought to North America by German immigrants, it is a common sight at summer cookouts, along with hot dogs. Many grocery stores and butcher shops sell varieties with popular additions such as cheddar cheese and jalapeño peppers. Wisconsin is the home of the "beer brat", where the brats are simmered in beer (generally a mixture of a pilsner style beer with butter and onions) before or after grilling over charcoal.

Bratwurst was popularized in Sheboygan County, Wisconsin, in the 1920s. In general, each local butcher shop would take orders and hand make bratwurst fresh to be picked up on a particular day. The fat content of the sausages was substantial, making daily pick up necessary to avoid spoilage; some of the fat is lost on cooking over charcoal.

Bratwurst has also become popular as a mainstay of sports stadiums, especially baseball parks, after Bill Sperling introduced bratwurst to Major League Baseball in Milwaukee County Stadium in 1954, when the Boston Braves moved to Milwaukee. The brats, which sold for 35 cents, were grilled and placed into a container of a special tomato sauce with green pepper and onions before being served. The bratwursts were so popular, Sperling said, that Duke Snider of the Brooklyn Dodgers took a case back to New York City. American Family Field in Milwaukee sells more bratwurst than hot dogs. Current American Family Field foodservice provider Delaware North (through their Sportservice subsidiary) markets Secret Stadium Sauce at retail as a complement to bratwurst.

Every year, during the Memorial Day weekend, the city of Madison, Wisconsin, hosts Brat Fest, which is billed as the "world's largest bratwurst festival".

The town of Bucyrus, Ohio (which calls itself the "Bratwurst Capital of America"), has held the three-day Bucyrus Bratwurst Festival annually since 1967.

== See also ==
- Blood sausage
- Bockwurst
- Boerewors
- Braadworst
- Currywurst
- Frankfurter Würstchen
- Hot dog
- Kielbasa
- List of sandwiches
- List of sausage dishes
- List of sausages
- Knackwurst
- Regensburger Wurst
- Weißwurst
- Wienerwurst
- Wollwurst
- Wurst mart
