= St. Galler Bratwurst =

Swiss sausage

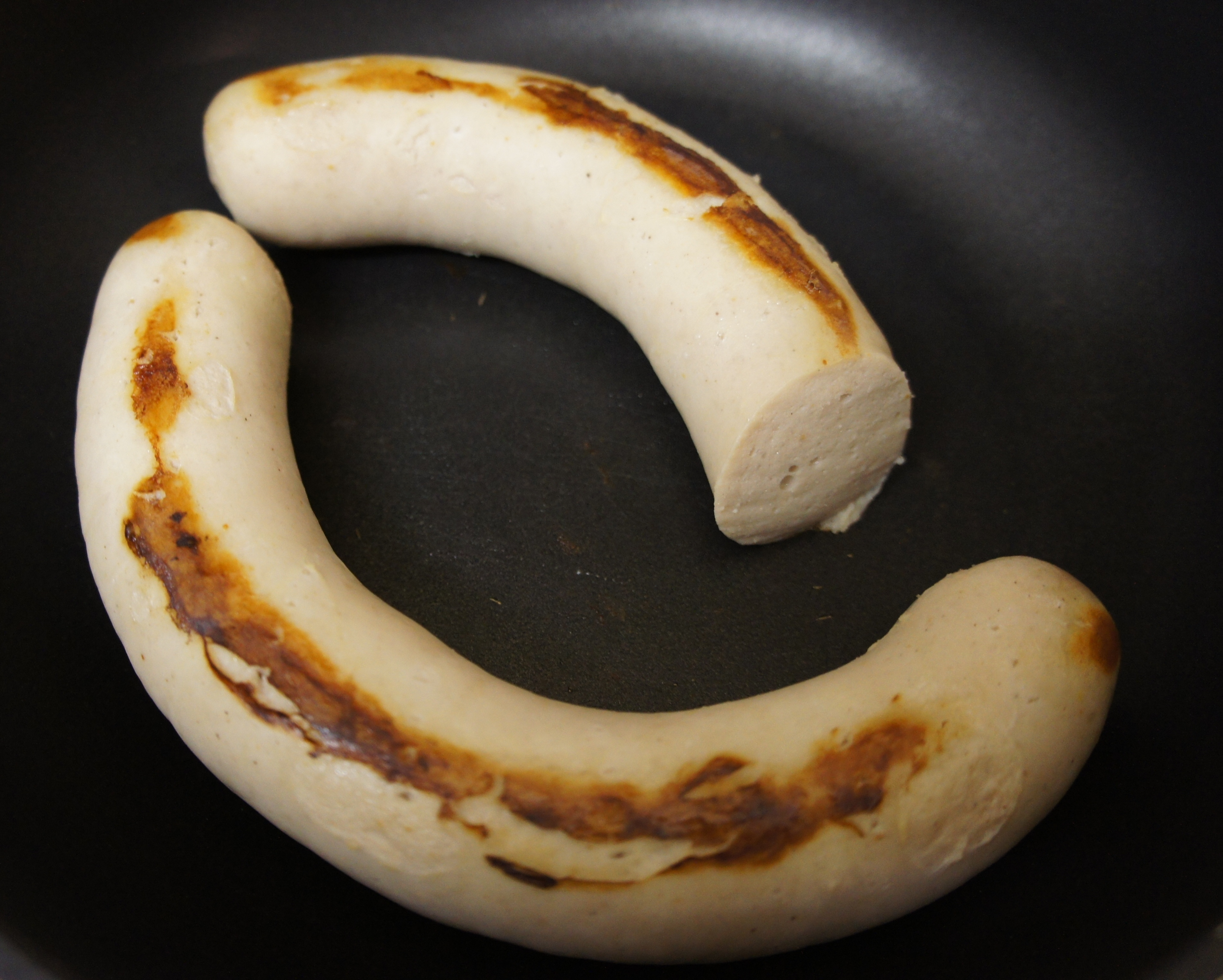
St. Galler Bratwurst in a pan

The St. Galler Bratwurst, also known as the Olma Bratwurst after OLMA (the agricultural show where it is served as a staple) is a bratwurst produced in Northeastern Switzerland. It is partly made with veal and has a white color. It is named after the city of St. Gallen.

The St. Galler Bratwurst is produced in the cantons of St. Gallen, Appenzell Innerrhoden, Appenzell Ausserrhoden and Thurgau. It is made with pork and veal. It also contains fresh milk, which gives it its distinctive white color. The sausage is flavored with a variety of spices, including cardamom, coriander, ginger, nutmeg, onion, leek, celery and lemon.

In the 1438 statutes of the Butchers' Guild of St. Gallen, it is stipulated that this sausage must be produced with veal, bacon, spices and fresh milk. The recipe has not changed since. Today it is protected by a PGI label.

It is commonly eaten as street food with very few accompaniments, such as bread and mustard. In the region of its origin the St. Galler Bratwurst is only served with bread without any sauces or mustard. But it is also part of several popular dishes, a notable example being rösti with veal sausage and onion sauce. Veal sausages, including the St. Galler, are the most popular sausages for grilling in Switzerland.

== See also ==
- Bratwurst
- Swiss sausages and cured meats
- Cervelat, another popular Swiss grilling sausage
- Schüblig, another popular Swiss grilling sausage
