= Cervelat =

Swiss sausage

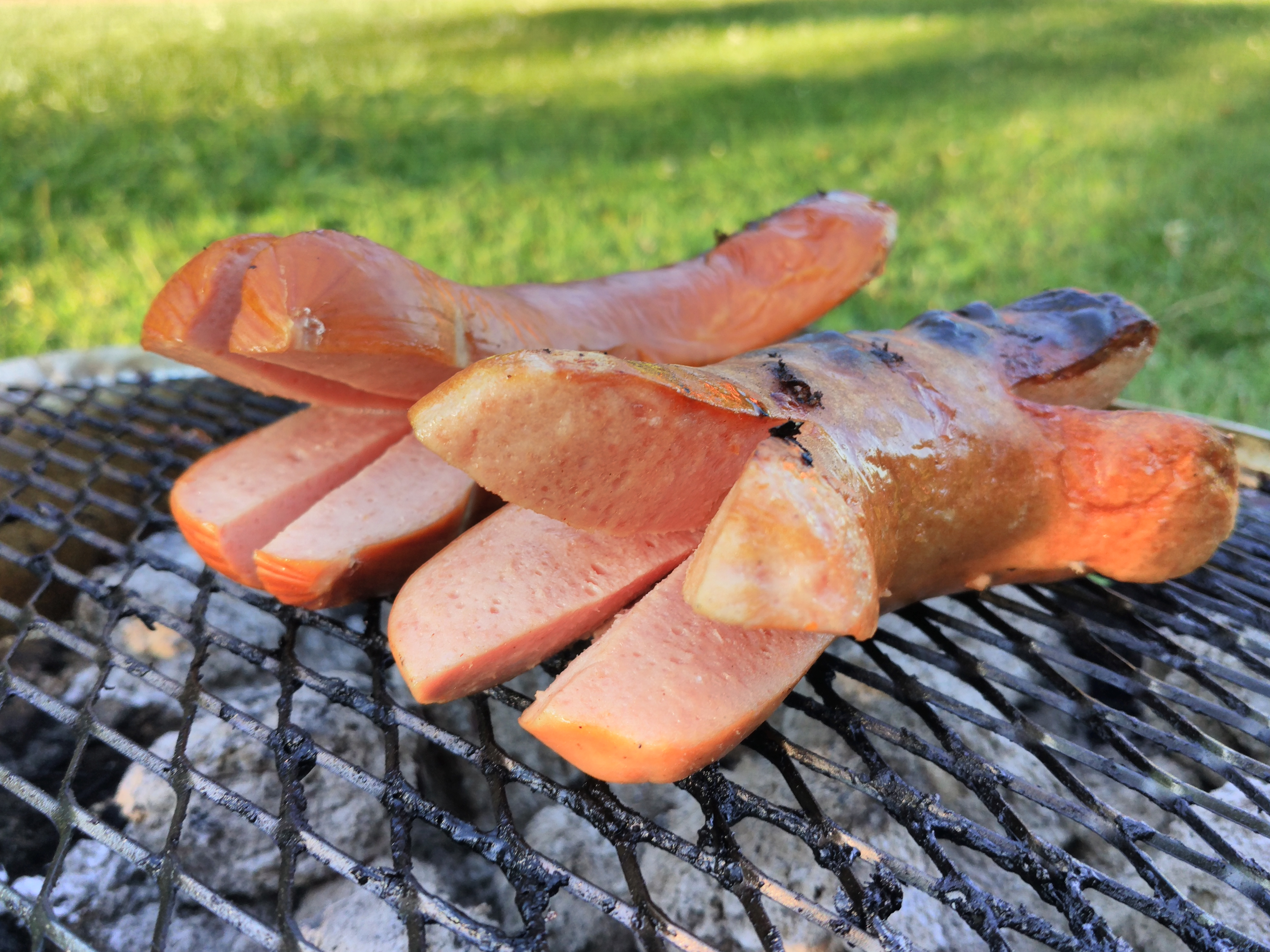
- Two grilled cervelats with their ends cut open in the traditional Swiss manner
- Alternative names: Cervelas, servelat
- Type: Sausage
- Place of origin: Switzerland, France (especially Alsace and Lyon), Belgium, Netherlands and parts of Germany
- Main ingredients: Beef, bacon, and pork rinds

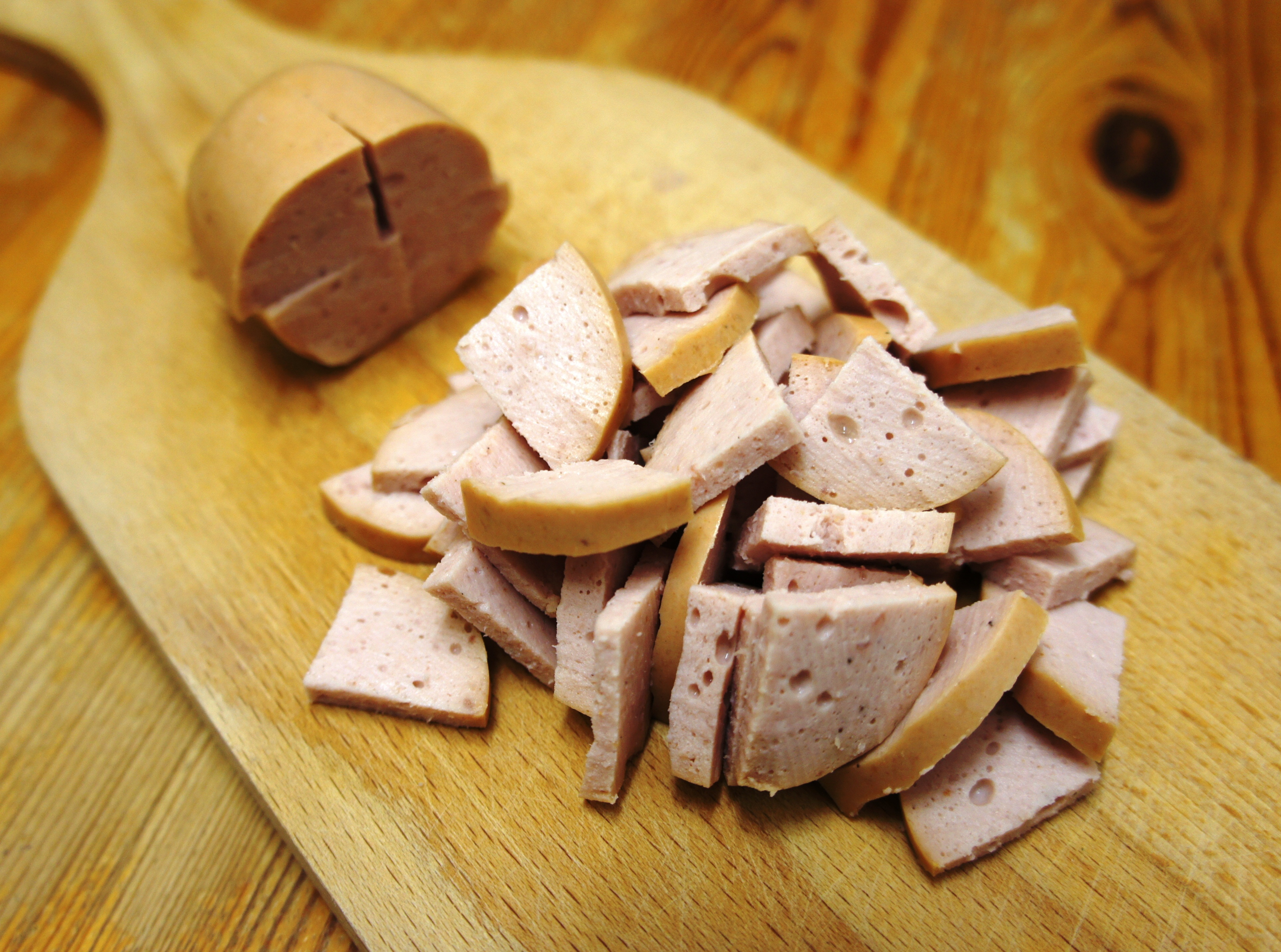
Cervelat cut in pieces typically used for Wurstsalat

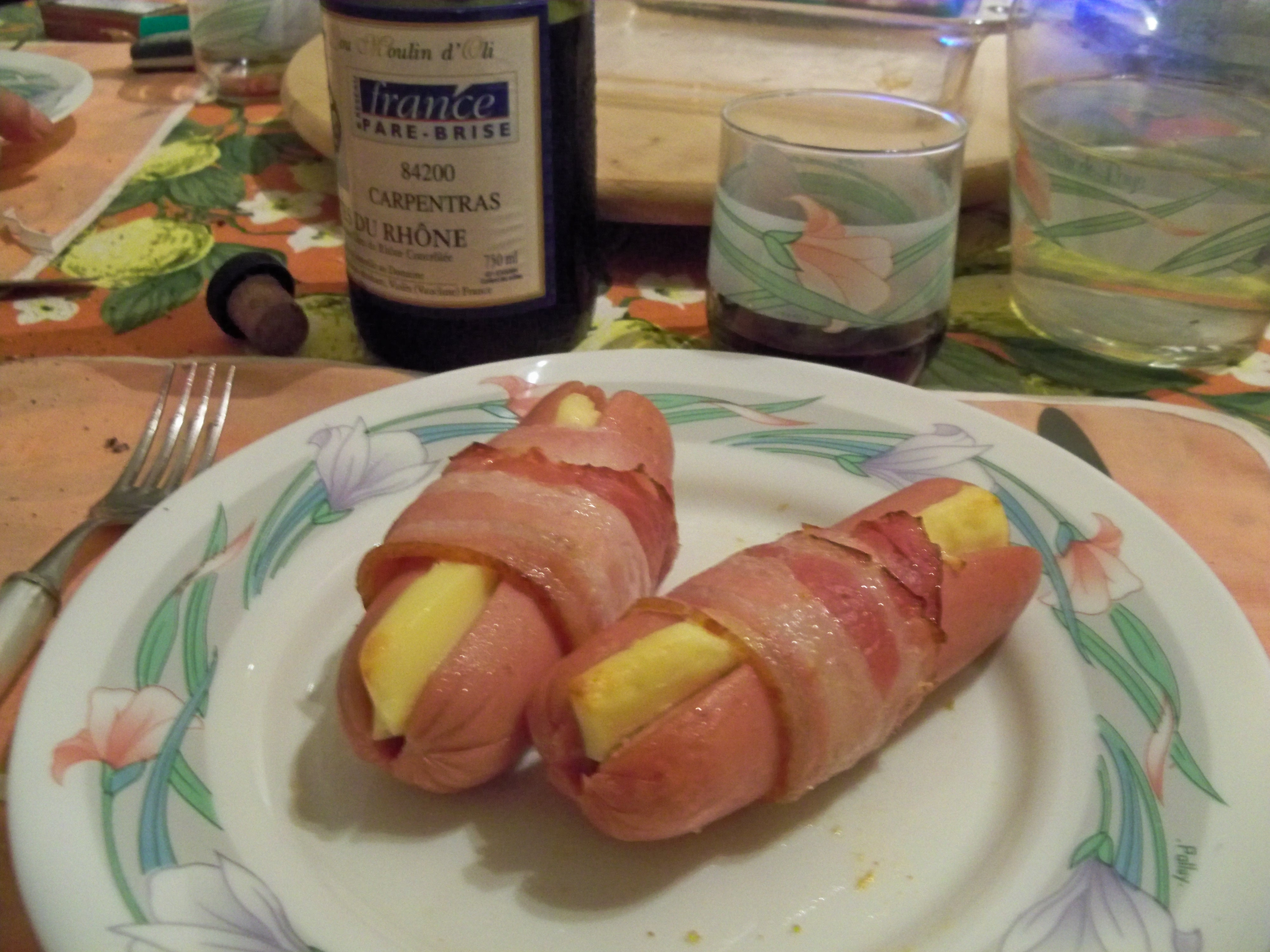
Cervelas à l'alsacienne with cheese and bacon

Cervelat, also cervelas, servelat or zervelat, is a sausage produced in Switzerland, France (especially Alsace and Lyon), Belgium, the Netherlands and parts of Germany. The recipe and preparation of the sausage vary regionally.

The sausages are spelled cervelas in the French-speaking part of Switzerland, Cervelat in the German-speaking part, and servelat in the Italian-speaking part. The terms ultimately derive from cerebrum, the Latin word for brain, which was used in early recipes. The term "Cervelat" is the oldest of the three. It was first recorded in 1552 by Rabelais, and is derived from zervelada, a Milanese word meaning a "large, short sausage filled with meat and pork brains." Modern recipes do not include brains, and arose towards the end of the 19th century in Basel, as a reworking of the traditional recipe. In Germany, the sausage is sometimes also called "Lyoner" which comes from its perceived origin. In the federal state of Saarland, the "Lyoner" sausage is even considered a regional staple dish.

The taste of the sausages depends on the region, but generally they are similar to that of a frankfurter, but with a smokier flavour and a texture brought about by its fat shape and the tightly wrapped natural casing. Various European semi-dry cervelat are similar to summer sausage in the U.S., and Thuringian sausage can be considered a type of cervelat. In the United States, the term Thuringer sausage is used for a type of cervelat, rather than Thuringian sausage in the European sense.

== Switzerland ==
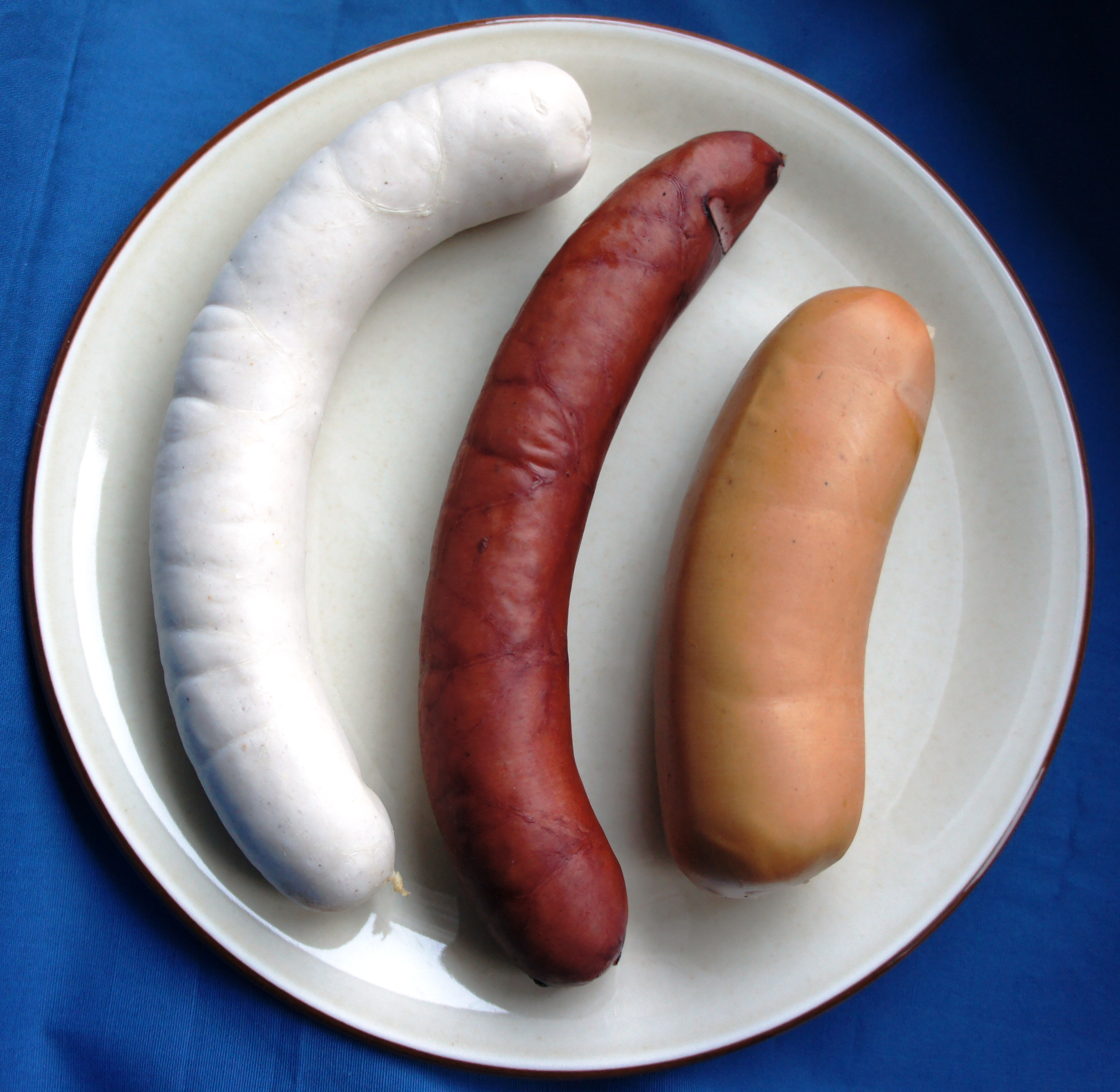
Cooked St. Galler bratwurst (left), schüblig (center), and cervelat (right)

In Switzerland, cervelats are cooked (slightly smoked and then boiled) or served "raw" (cold, having been cooked during initial manufacture). They contain a mixture of beef, bacon and pork rind. The modern Swiss variety is packed into zebu intestines.

The cervelat is often referred to as the national sausage of Switzerland. Some 160 million cervelats weighing 27,000 metric tons are produced in Switzerland annually, which is equivalent to a consumption of 25 sausages per person each year. Grilling cervelats over an open fire with the ends cut open so they expand like a butterfly's wings is a childhood memory for nearly every Swiss person; as a result, many Swiss are emotionally attached to the sausage. Swiss cervelats are made of roughly equal parts of beef, pork, bacon, pork rind and ice, which helps bind the ingredients, along with spices, curing salt and cutter additives. The ingredients are finely minced in a cutter, packed into beef intestines, smoked for an hour and then cooked by boiling for a short time. Processed and packaged varieties sold in Swiss supermarkets also contain nitrites and antioxidants. A cervelat may weigh from about 100 to 200 grams.

Swiss cervelats are prepared and eaten cooked or raw. They are boiled, grilled or fried. They can also be served uncooked, either in a salad or with bread and mustard.

Sometimes sold smoked and uncooked, cervelat can be seasoned, salted and cold smoked for one day.

=== 2008 casings shortage ===
Traditionally, Swiss beef intestines were used for the casings, but towards the end of the 20th century, local cattle producers lost interest in cleaning and preparing them, so meat processors switched to Brazilian zebu intestines, which are not fatty and do not easily split open when roasted. However, beginning on 1 April 2006, the European Union banned the import of many animal parts from Brazil as a measure aimed at preventing the spread of mad cow disease. Among these were beef intestines. Although Switzerland is not an EU member state, it is bound to observe European food protection laws through other treaty agreements. Hence, Swiss and German stockpiles of zebu intestines became very low by 2008, threatening production altogether, and causing some controversy in Switzerland. In January of that year, the Swiss meat industry announced that a national "cervelat task force" had failed in an exhaustive search for an acceptable alternative to zebu intestines.

The New York Times noted that "the possible demise of cervelas visibly upset the Swiss, a normally even-tempered people." The cervelat production crisis was covered closely by the Swiss media and in a newspaper poll, 72% of those surveyed said the "cervelas, as they knew it, had to be saved." The cervelat crisis was brought up in a parliamentary debate wherein state councillor and president of the Swiss Meat Association, Rolf Büttiker, spoke of the national sausage's social significance, calling it a "cult sausage" and "the worker's steak". The Swiss government entered into negotiations with the EU to seek an exception for zebu intestines, and Swiss scientists were sent to Brazil hoping to show that the intestines posed no risk of transmitting mad cow disease.

By August 2008, most of the Swiss demand for bovine intestines had been met with imports from Uruguay, Argentina and Paraguay.

== France ==
Cervelas de Lyon are a sausage specialty of Lyonnaise cuisine. They contain finely minced pork, and either truffles or pistachios. Sold uncooked, the sausage has to be boiled before it is eaten.

In Alsatian cuisine, cervelas d'Alsace are split open and served with cheese (gruyère) and bacon.

== See also ==
- Culinary Heritage of Switzerland
- Animal production and consumption in Switzerland
- Swiss sausages and cured meats
- List of sausages
- Saveloy
- Falukorv
