= Schüblig =

Type of Swiss smoked sausage

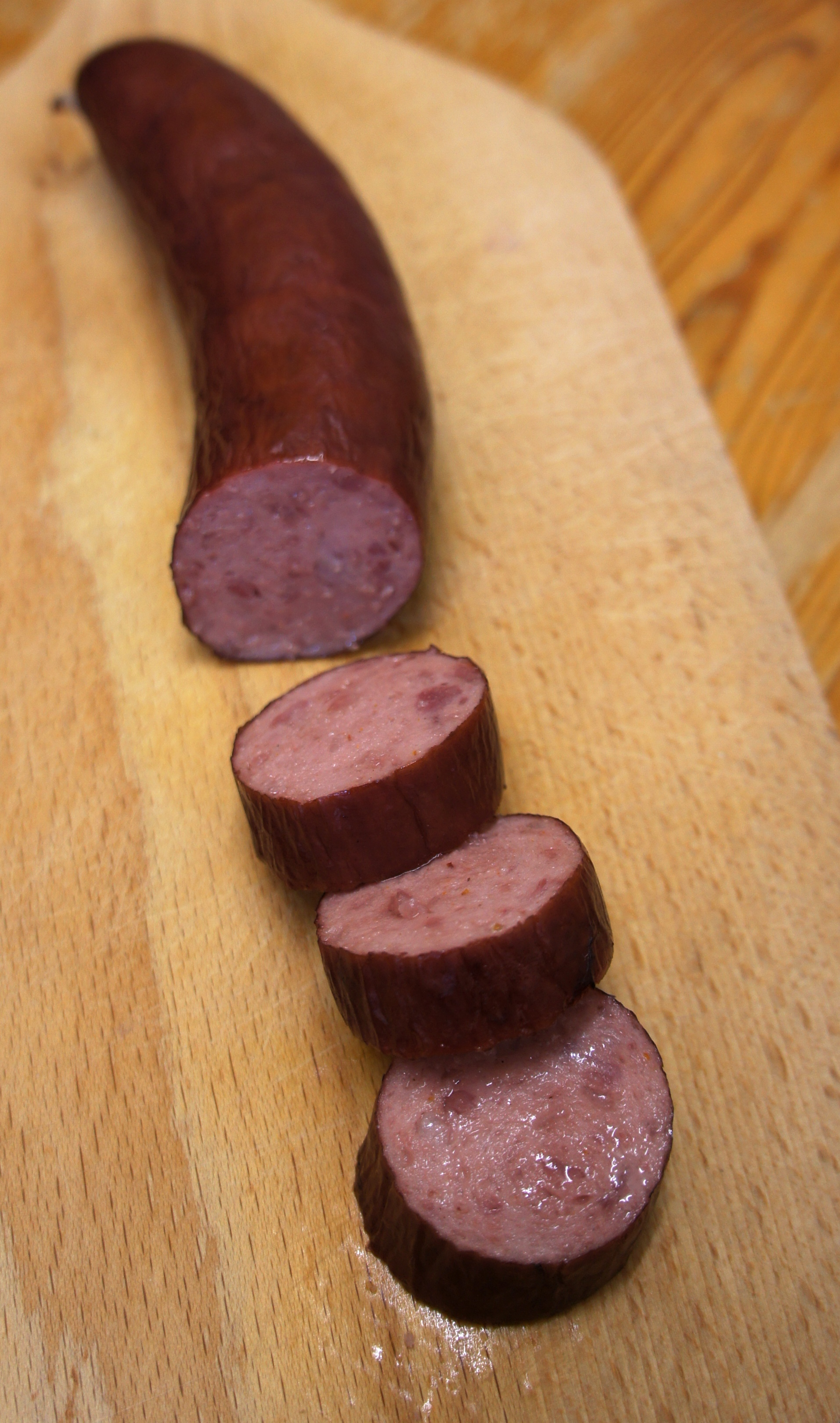
- A cooked schüblig
- Type: Sausage
- Course: Main
- Place of origin: Switzerland/Germany
- Main ingredients: Meat (pork, beef

Schüblig are various heavily smoked sausages made throughout the German-speaking part of Switzerland as well as the Black Forest and Lake Constance areas of southern Germany. Made of pork or beef, some schüblig are classified as dry sausage, while others are cooked smoked sausage. In Eastern Switzerland, Häsch Schüblig i de Ore? (have you got schüblig in your ears?) is a common saying when someone misunderstands and cannot make out what is being said.

Schüblig is available in most Swiss cities.

== Nutrition ==
A single sausage contains 315 kcal, 27 g of fat, 13 g of protein.

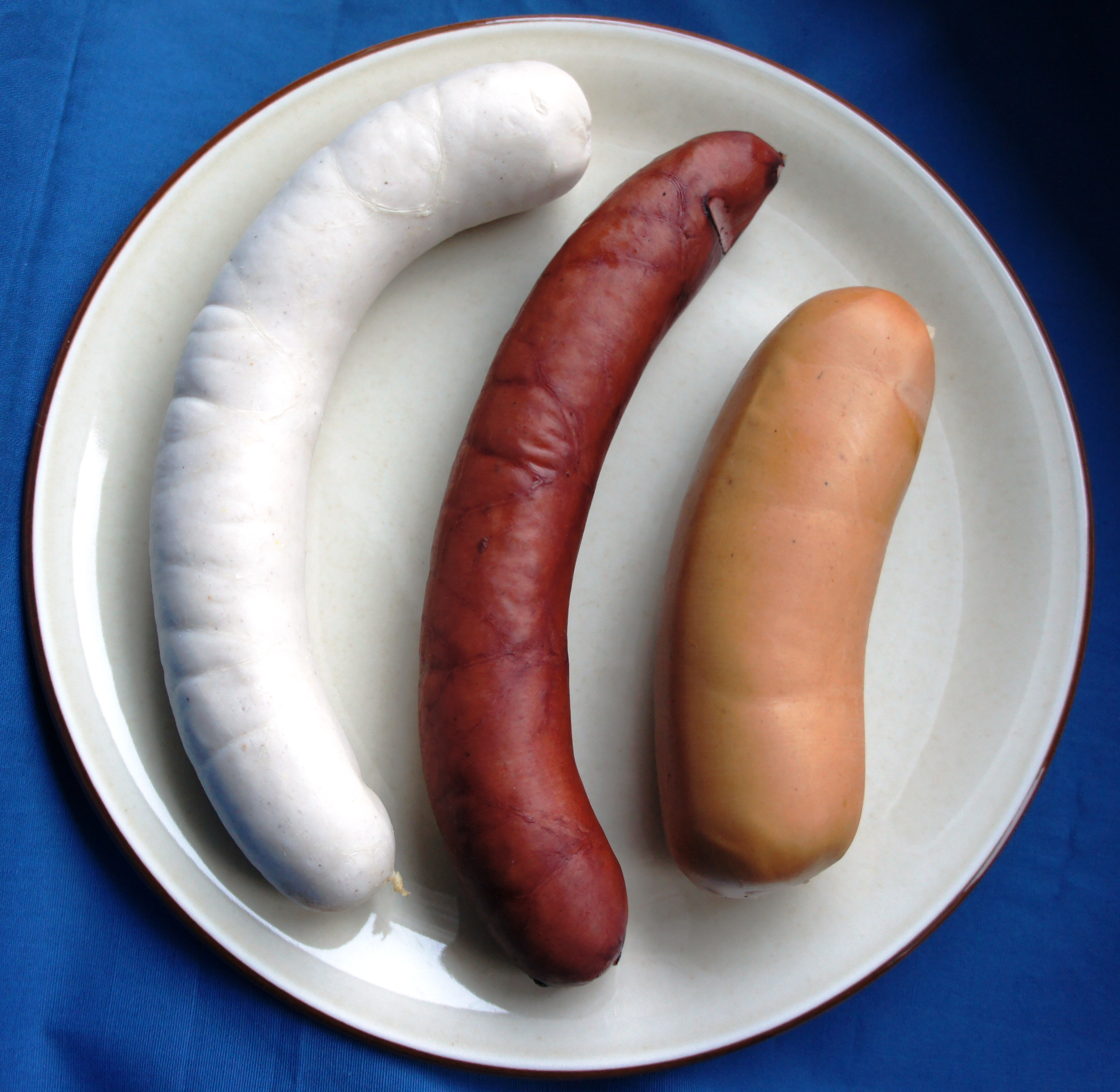
Cooked St. Galler bratwurst (left), schüblig (center), and cervelas (right)

== See also ==
- Cervelat
- Culinary Heritage of Switzerland
- Swiss sausages and cured meats
- List of sausages
