= Benjamin Lamb =

English organist

Benjamin Lamb (fl. 1715) was an English organist.

He was the son of Captain Benjamin Lamb, one of the Poor Knights of Windsor, and followed his elder brother William into the choir of St George's Chapel on 24 November 1683.

He was the organist of Eton College and verger of St. George's Chapel, Windsor, about 1715. He wrote much church music and some songs. Among the former may be mentioned his anthems, 'Unto Thee have I cried,' 'O worship the Lord,' 'If the Lord Himself,' 'I will give thanks,' and an evening service in E minor, all of which are in the Tudway Collection.
