= Sentry Foods =

Wisconsin supermarket chain

- Industry: Retail (Grocery)
- Founded: 1960; 66 years ago
- Founder: Godfrey family
- Headquarters: Milwaukee, Wisconsin
- Number of locations: 8 (2026)
- Area served: Wisconsin
- Products: Bakery, dairy, deli, frozen foods, general grocery, meat, pharmacy, produce, seafood, snacks
- Website: www.sentryfoods.com

Sentry Foods is a grocery store chain with a total of eight stores, all in Wisconsin.

Sentry Foods stores got their start in the Milwaukee area in the 1960s, being operated and supplied by the Godfrey family. In the mid-1980s, Fleming Companies, Inc., at the time a major wholesaler, bought the majority of the stores and took over supplying them. Being predominantly a wholesaler, Fleming was never a major force in the retail market, and as a result of missteps and poor financial choices, Fleming went bankrupt in 2000 and was forced to sell off the stores. Each store is now independently owned and operated. As recently as 2007, 34 stores were operated under the Sentry name, but the chain was decimated by the Great Recession.
