= Alliant Energy Center =

Multi-building complex in Madison, Wisconsin

Coordinates: 43.043952°N 89.380710°W

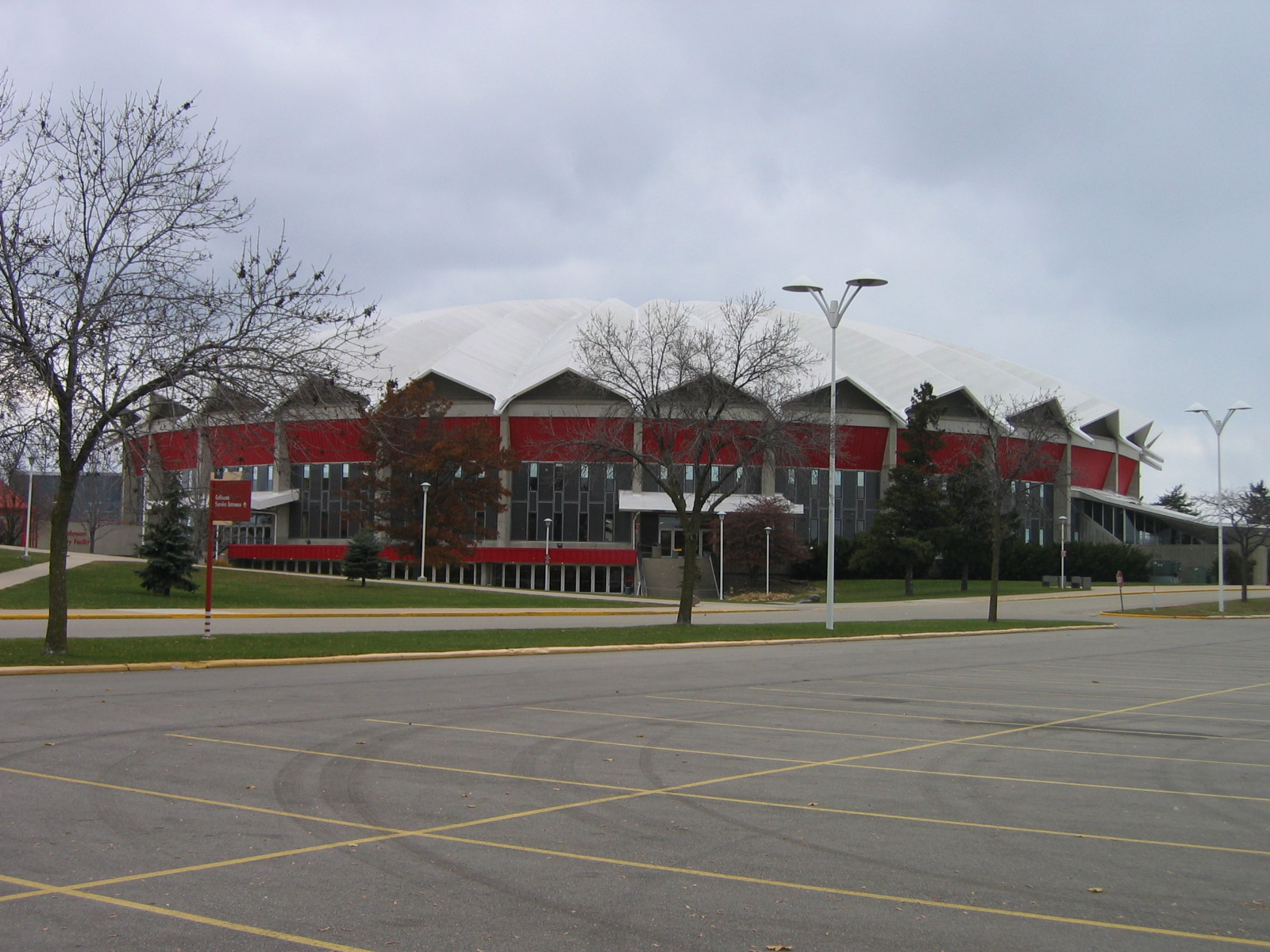
- Interactive map of Alliant Energy Center
- Former names: Dane County Expo Center (1967–2000)
- Location: 1919 Alliant Energy Center Way; Madison, Wisconsin 53713, U.S.
- Owner: Dane County
- Operator: Dane County
- Capacity: 10,231 (Veterans Memorial Coliseum)
- Public transit: Metro Transit

Construction
- Opened: 1967

Alliant Energy Center is a multi-building complex located in Madison, Wisconsin. It comprises 164 acres (0.66 km^{2}) of greenspace and includes the 255,000-square-foot (23,700 m^{2}) Exhibition Hall, the 10,000-seat Veterans Memorial Coliseum, the 29-acre (0.12 km^{2}) Willow Island, several multi-use pavilions, and the 22,000-square-foot (2,000 m^{2}) Arena. The Center welcomes more than one million people attending more than 500 events annually, ranging from local meetings and banquets to large sporting events and major concerts.

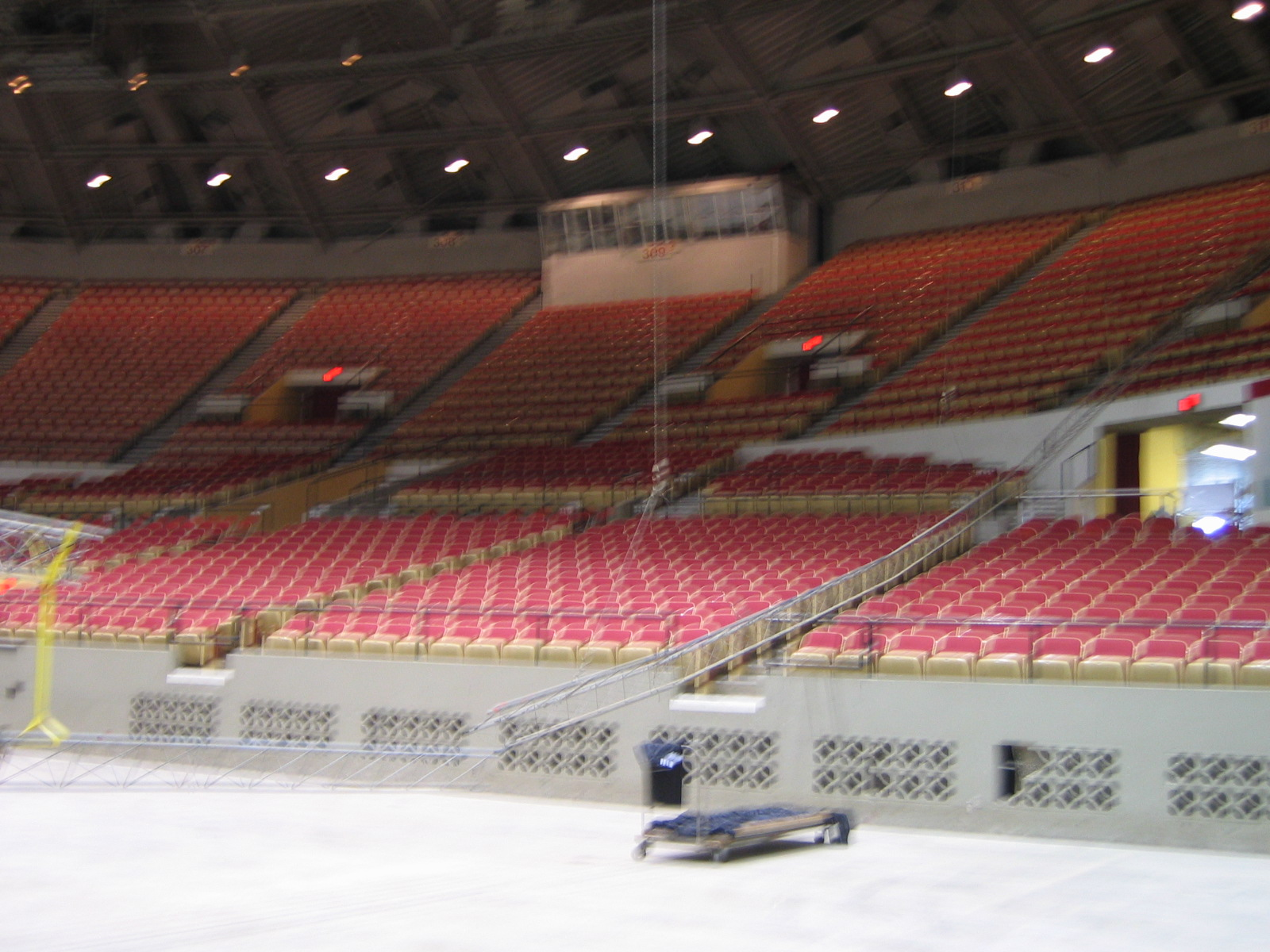
2006

== Location ==
The Alliant Energy Center campus is located on the south side of Madison, Wisconsin, off of John Nolen Drive and Rimrock Road.

== History ==
In 1895, the Agricultural Society and Dane County purchased 250 acres (1.0 km^{2}) of land at the current site to provide an area that could be used for the Dane County Fair. This area was known as "Lakeside Park Farm", but some thought it merely represented a worthless swampland. Because of financial difficulties, the Dane County Fair was halted on the site in 1938 and did not return until 1951. During this time, even though the Dane County Fair was held in an alternate location, the County board did not abandon the site and Dane County managed to pay off the mortgage for the property in 1941.

As a major turning point towards the advent of a full-service venue, roads, parking lots, sewer and water, a heating plant and kitchen/bathroom facilities were built on the grounds in 1949–51. In 1951, the Dane County Fair moved back to the present Alliant Energy Center (formerly the Expo Center) and remains there today.

Over the ensuing years, the first buildings were erected on the site. In 1954, the Arena was built; it remains the only building still standing from this era. The Youth Building was constructed in 1962 and housed the offices for 4-H in Dane County. This area now serves as the administration building for the Alliant Energy Center. In 1967, Veterans Memorial Coliseum was built. Its early clientele included the Zor Shrine Circus, World Dairy Expo, the Ice Capades, Dane County Junior Fair, and The ABC National Bowling Tournament.

=== Concerts ===
The Dane County Coliseum featured numerous stars including Frank Sinatra, Bob Hope, Tony Bennett, Duke Ellington, Janis Joplin, Jimi Hendrix, The Doors, David Bowie, Pink Floyd, Jethro Tull, The Who, Elvis Presley, Bob Dylan, and the Grateful Dead who played there a total of six times between February 1973 and June 1983.

=== Exposition Center Commission ===
In 1974, the first Exposition Center Commission was appointed. This Committee headed construction and development for the present Alliant Energy Center (formerly Expo Center). With the Coliseum schedule reaching 160 event days in 1977, it was clear that the demand for trade and consumer shows and conventions was competing with concerts, sporting events and family shows. Over time, the market area had expanded well beyond Wisconsin and the committee recognized the need for expansion. In 1978, an addition to the Youth Building was built (now the Administration Building) and the new facility was named the Forum. At the time, this facility offered the area's largest facilities for trade shows, banquets and other public functions. The forum was replaced with the construction of Exhibition Hall in 1995.

Veterans Memorial Coliseum celebrated its 25th anniversary in 1992. At this point, over 16 million people had entered the Coliseum doors to attend a vast array of events.

As a consequence of the large demand for exhibit space, the 255,000-square-foot (23,700 m^{2}) Exhibition Hall was built at Alliant Energy Center in 1995 as the largest unobstructed facility for trade/consumer shows and conventions in the state.

The naming rights for the campus, previously the Dane County Exposition Center, were sold in 2000 to Alliant Energy Corporation, which holds the naming rights to the Expo Center for 20 years. The agreement does not include the naming rights of individual buildings on the campus, which have all retained their original names.

Although the naming rights belong to Alliant Energy, the center is owned and operated by Dane County. The Alliant Energy Center operates without the use of County general fund monies - it is run as a business using facility-generated revenues to cover the expenses incurred to operate the center and its facilities. The center has operated in this manner since 1990.

In 2013, Dane County completed plans for the construction of new multi-use pavilions at the Alliant Energy Center. Pavilions totaling 290,000 square feet (27,000 m^{2}) replaced nine agricultural barns. Construction began in April 2014 and was completed by late September for the 2014 World Dairy Expo. A multimillion-dollar naming rights deal for the facilities with New Holland Agriculture & Construction, along with other public/private funding partnerships with the State of Wisconsin, World Dairy Expo, the Midwest Horse Fair/Wisconsin Horse Council, and AEC food service provider, Centerplate, financed the expansion.

== Veterans Memorial Coliseum ==
Veterans Memorial Coliseum (formerly known as Dane County Coliseum), built in 1967, is a 10,231-seat (7,432 seats for basketball and hockey) multi-purpose arena that is the centerpiece of the Alliant Energy Center campus. It is a site for concerts, family shows, sporting events, consumer shows, conventions and assemblies. The building was completely renovated in 2004–2005.

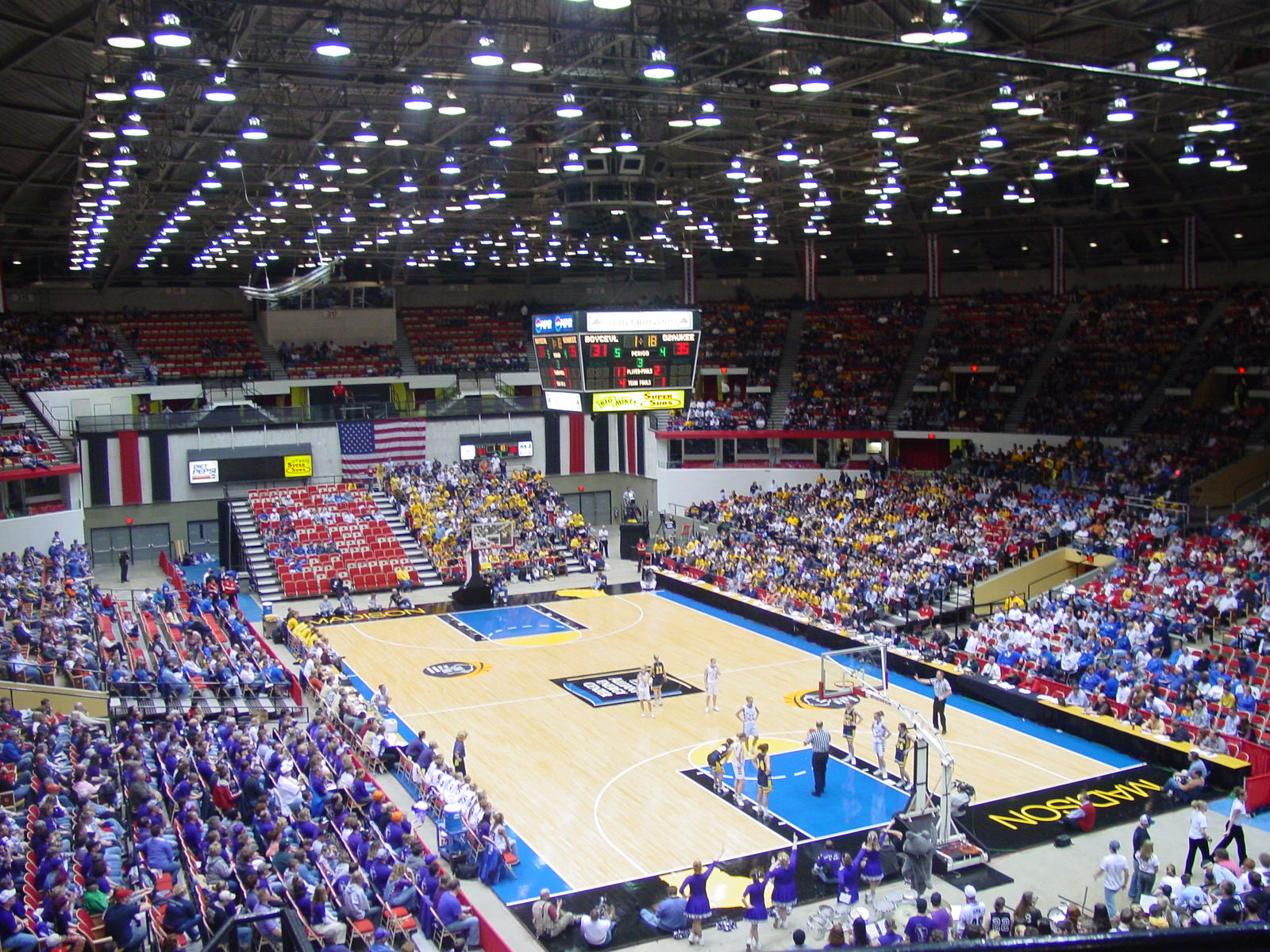
The Coliseum during the 2004 WIAA Girl's State Basketball Tournament

The Coliseum has a long-standing history as a hockey venue. The building was home to the Wisconsin Badgers men's hockey team from the 1967–68 season to the 1997–98 season, when they moved to the Kohl Center on campus. It was one of the largest college hockey arenas in the nation, as well as one of the loudest. Reportedly, the "sieve chant," which is now commonly heard in nearly every arena to taunt the opposing goalie after a goal, was first started at the Coliseum. The environment for Badger hockey games was such that it was nicknamed "the Montreal Forum of college hockey." Badger fans still call the arena "the Great Dane."

The Wisconsin Badgers women's hockey team also played a number of games on the Coliseum ice in their first two seasons (1999-00 and 2000–01). The Wisconsin Interscholastic Athletic Association (WIAA) boys' and girls' state hockey tournaments also take place each year in Veterans Memorial Coliseum. State tournaments for boys' hockey have been held in the Coliseum since 1971, except in 1974 and 1975 when they were held in Green Bay. All state tournaments for girls' hockey have been held in the Coliseum since 2001–02. The Coliseum was also home to two minor league hockey franchises, the Madison Monsters from 1995 until 1999, and the Madison Kodiaks in 1999–2000. The Madison Mad Dogs, an indoor football team, also played in the Coliseum from 1998 to 2000. In 2009, indoor football returned to the Coliseum as the Continental Indoor Football League's Wisconsin Wolfpack played the 2009 season there. However, the following season the Wolfpack moved to the Hartmeyer Ice Arena. The Madison Capitols played its home games at the Coliseum between 2014 and 2017, before moving to Bob Suter's Capitol Ice Arena prior to their 2017-18 season.

== Exhibition Hall ==
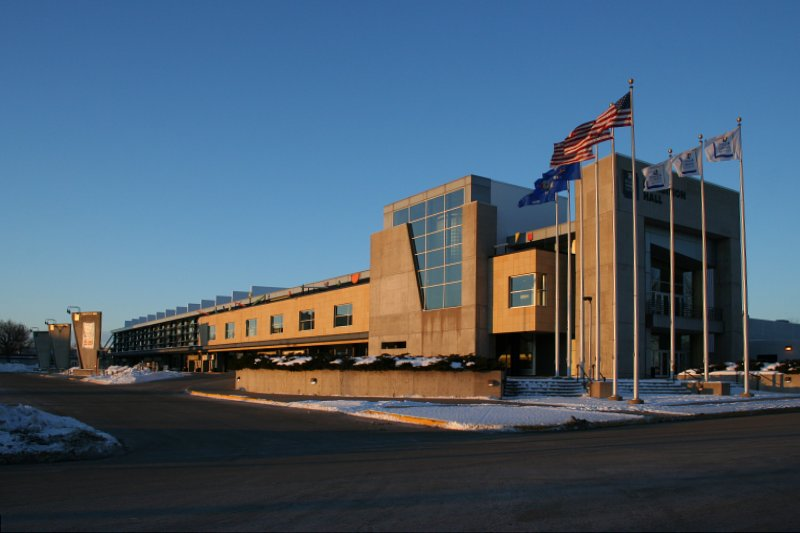
Exhibition Hall at the Alliant Energy Center

Exhibition Hall, on the Alliant Energy Center campus, has 255,000 square feet (23,700 m^{2}) of exhibit space. This building hosts conventions, trade shows, consumer shows, meetings and conferences. Completed in September 1995, Exhibition Hall consists of 14 meeting rooms totaling 20,000 square feet (1,900 m^{2}), a lobby and four exhibit halls from 20,000 to 100,000 square feet (9,300 m^{2}).

Directly connected to Exhibition Hall by a climate-controlled walkway is Clarion Suites Madison - Central with 140 guest rooms.

The building allows light from the outside to enliven a multi-leveled lobby with a lounge area overlooking the exhibition halls. Two three-dimensional statues, 'The Farmer's Market Cow' and 'Gallop to Glory Horse', that were painted by local artists to represent community connections and long-time events at the venue, are perched atop the entrance doors.

=== Geologic Time ===
Geologic Time, created by artist Michele Oka Doner, consists of over 900 bronze medallions inlaid in the terrazzo floor of Exhibition Hall's lobby. The images tell a story through pictures. Elements of many eras, past and present are depicted, including Wisconsin corn, Native American effigy mounds, and the state's lake and rivers. The medallions signify the passage of time and the connection between past and present.

Some of the medallions represent the natural and cultural environment of Dane County and Wisconsin, such as fish, turtles, cattails, water lilies, and salamanders. Connecting the natural elements to cultural developments in the region are images of artifacts left by the first inhabitants. These artifacts were used for hunting and gathering. Wisconsin industries are also incorporated into the design. Other elements represented in bronze are the state bird (robin), flower (violet), and tree (maple).

As an extension of Geologic Time, a podium displays the cast bronze form of Chief Black Hawk, which adorns the lobby of Exhibition Hall.

== Willow Island ==
Willow Island is a 29-acre (120,000 m^{2}) natural area with two ponds encircling a 7-acre (28,000 m^{2}) isthmus. It was developed in 2002 and made its debut as an outdoor venue in 2003. Willow Island is used for outdoor festivals, consumer shows, corporate events, music events, auctions and more.

In 2004, Willow Island hosted the fifth year of the ESPN Great Outdoor Games, which feature athletes competing in outdoor activities including fishing, sporting dog events, target shooting, and timber events.

Starting in 2005, Willow Island became the new location for the annual Brat Fest fundraiser that takes place on Memorial Day weekend.

The WJJO Band Camp music festival was held at Willow Island from 2004 - 2015. The one-day hard rock music festival was known to draw upwards of 10,000 fans.

== Environmental impact ==
On April 19, 2007, the Alliant Energy Center was recognized by Travel Green Wisconsin as a recipient of the Travel Green Certification. Sponsored by the Wisconsin Department of Tourism, Travel Green Wisconsin recognizes tourism-related businesses that are reducing their environmental impact through operational and other improvements.

Through the center's use of green space on Willow Island and environmentally friendly purchasing practices, the Alliant Energy Center has helped build sustainable tourism in Wisconsin. The Center implemented energy-saving measures in Exhibition Hall, which included energy-efficient lighting and upgrades to reduce gas emissions.
