= Adina =

Adina may refer to:

== Places ==
=== India ===
- Adina Deer Park, a deer sanctuary in Malda district, West Bengal
- Adina Kottige, a village in Karnataka
- Adina Mosque, a ruined mosque in West Bengal

=== Other countries ===
- Adina, Ghana, a town in the Volta Region of Ghana
- Adina, Khyber Pakhtunkhwa, a town in Swabi District, Khyber Pukhtunkhwa, Pakistan
- Adina, Spain, a parish in Sanxenxo
- Adina, Scythia, an ancient settlement in what is now Bulgaria

== People ==
- Adina (given name)
- Aidin (name)

== Organisations ==
- Adina, the former English name of the Chinese bakery chain Addlove
- ADINA, a commercial engineering simulation software program
- Adina Apartment Hotels
- Adina World Beat Beverages, a manufacturer of coffee, tea and juice drinks based in San Francisco, California

== Other uses ==
- Adina (opera), an 1826 opera by Gioachino Rossini
- Adina (plant), a genus of flowering plants in the family Rubiaceae
- Adina (butterfly), a genus of butterflies in the subfamily Eudaminae

== See also ==
- Adina Megha, a 1970 Indian Odia-language film
- Adina's Deck, a 2007 American DVD film series about internet safety aimed toward 9- to 15-year-old children
- Menippe adina, a species of crab native to the Gulf of Mexico
