= Adina (given name) =

Female given name

- Gender: Female

Origin
- Meaning: Gentle, mild, delight, faith

Other names
- Variant form: Edina

Adina is a female given name.

In the Balkans, Adina is popular among Bosniaks in the former Yugoslav nations. The name is either a modification of the name Eden, which means "delight," or a modification of the name Edina, which is derived from the Arabic word دين (din), meaning faith. This region also has a male equivalent: Adin (for example, Adin Vrabac).

In Hebrew, Adina (עדינה) means "gentle" or "mild".

== Given name ==
- Adina, in Jewish tradition, is the mother of Rachel and Leah, while another, Adina daughter of Yovav ben Yoktan, is the wife of Levi
- Adina (biblical figure), male given name spelled עדינא, listed in I Chronicles 11:42 as one of the "mighty men" of King David's army
- Adina (singer), Ghanaian musician
- Adina Anton (born 1984), Romanian long jumper who competed in the 2004 Summer Olympics
- Adina Bar-On (born 1951), Israeli performance artist
- Adina Bar-Shalom (born 1945 or 1946), Israeli educator, columnist and social activist
- Adina Bastidas (born 1943), Venezuelan economist active in politics
- Adina Beg (died 1758), Governor of the Punjab
- Adina Fohlin (born 1984), Swedish model and photographer
- Adina Giurgiu (born 1994), Romanian women's footballer
- Adina Hoffman (born 1967), American essayist, critic, and biographer
- Adina Howard (born 1973), American singer and songwriter
- Adina Izarra (born 1959), Venezuelan musician, music educator and composer
- Adina Kamien, art curator
- Adina Mandlová (1910–1991), Czech actress, sex-symbol, and European movie star
- Adina Laura Meiroșu (born 1985), Romanian handballer
- Adina Porter (born 1971), American actress
- Adina Salaoru (born 1989), Romanian female volleyball player
- Adina Tal (active from 1985), Swiss-born Israeli actress, playwright and theater director
- Adina-Ioana Vălean (born 1968), Romanian politician and social activist

== See also ==
- Adina (disambiguation)
- Adena (name)
- Edina (name)
- Idina
