= Adinah (disambiguation) =

Adinah is Laban's wife in the Bible.

Adinah may also refer to:

- Adinah, Yemen
- Adinah Alexander, Broadway actress; see Parade (musical)

== See also ==
- Adena (disambiguation)
- Adina (disambiguation)
