= Edina (given name) =

Female given name

- Gender: Female

Origin
- Meaning: Delight, faith

Other names
- Variant form: Adina

Edina is a female given name.

== Given names ==
=== Athletes ===
- Edina Dobi (born 1987), Hungarian volleyball player
- Edina Füsti (born 1982), Hungarian race walker
- Edina Gallovits-Hall (born 1984), Romanian tennis player
- Edina Gangl (born 1990), Hungarian water polo goalkeeper
- Edina Knapek (born 1977), Hungarian fencer
- Edina Kocan (born 2002), Luxembourger footballer
- Edina Kotsis (born 1990), Hungarian taekwondoist
- Edina Müller (born 1983), German wheelchair basketball player

=== Arts and literature ===
- Edina Altara (1898–1983), Italian illustrator, decorator and fashion designer
- Edina Balogh (born 1984), Hungarian actress, model, and beauty queen
- Edina Kulcsár (born 1990), Hungarian actress, model, and beauty queen
- Edina Ronay (born 1943), Hungarian fashion designer and former actress
- Edina Szvoren (born 1974), Hungarian writer

=== Other ===
- Edina Alves Batista (born 1980), Brazilian football referee
- Edina Leković, Montenegrin American academic
- Edina Papo, Bosnian choreographer and pedagogue
- Edina Tóth, Hungarian politician
- Edina Pop (born 1947), Hungarian-born German singer and member of Dschinghis Khan

== Fictional characters ==
- Edina Monsoon, fictional character from the British sitcom Absolutely Fabulous

== See also ==
- Edina (disambiguation)
- Adina (given name)
- Adena (name)
- Idina
