= Blindekuh (restaurant) =

blindekuh
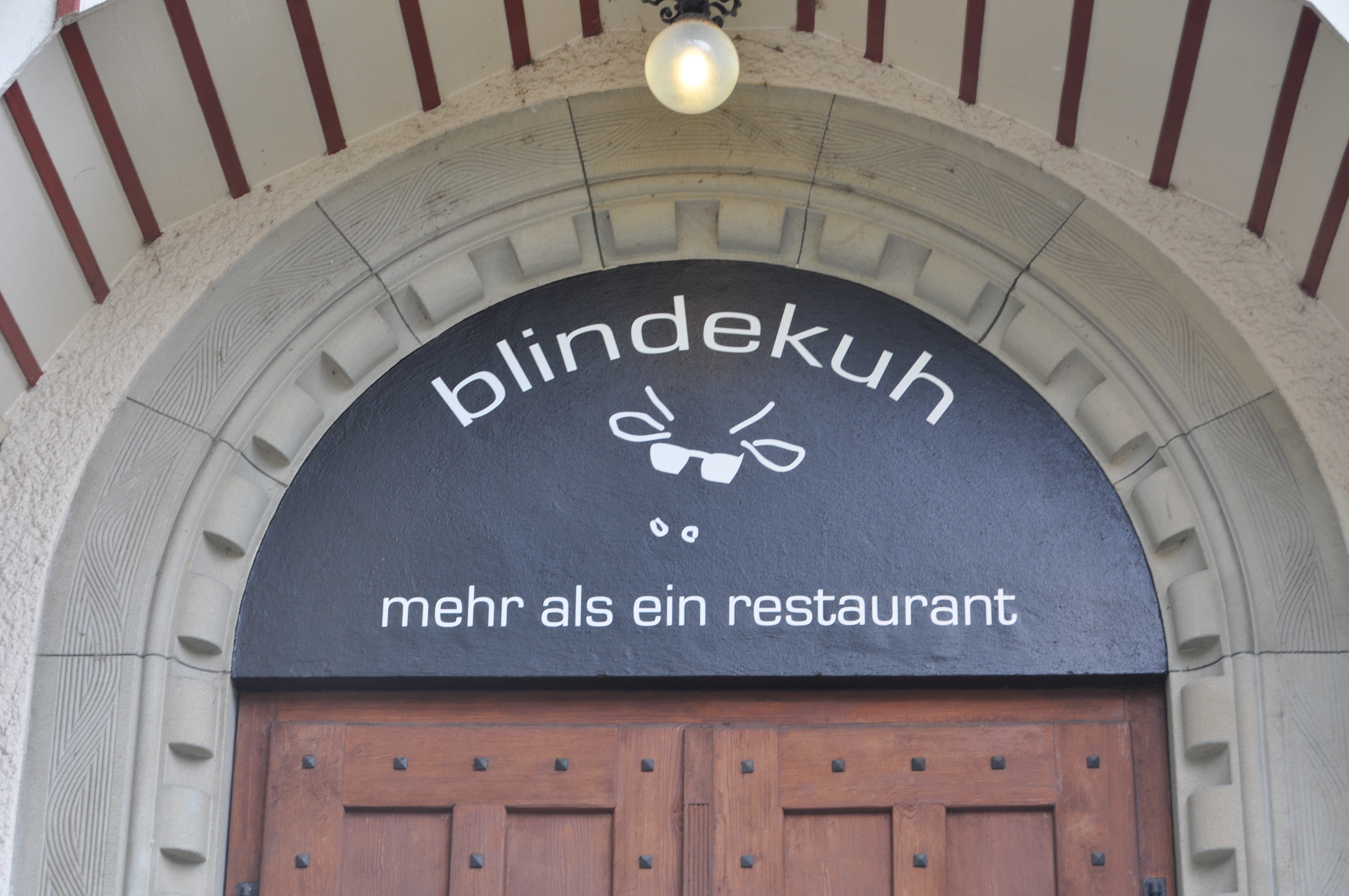
- Zurich restaurant entrance in 2014
- Interactive map of blindekuh

Restaurant information
- Established: September 17, 1999
- Location: Mühlebachstrasse 148, Zurich, Switzerland
- Coordinates: 47°21′29.7756″N 8°33′25.9164″E
- Other locations: Dornacherstrasse 192, Basel, Switzerland
- Website: www.blindekuh.ch/en

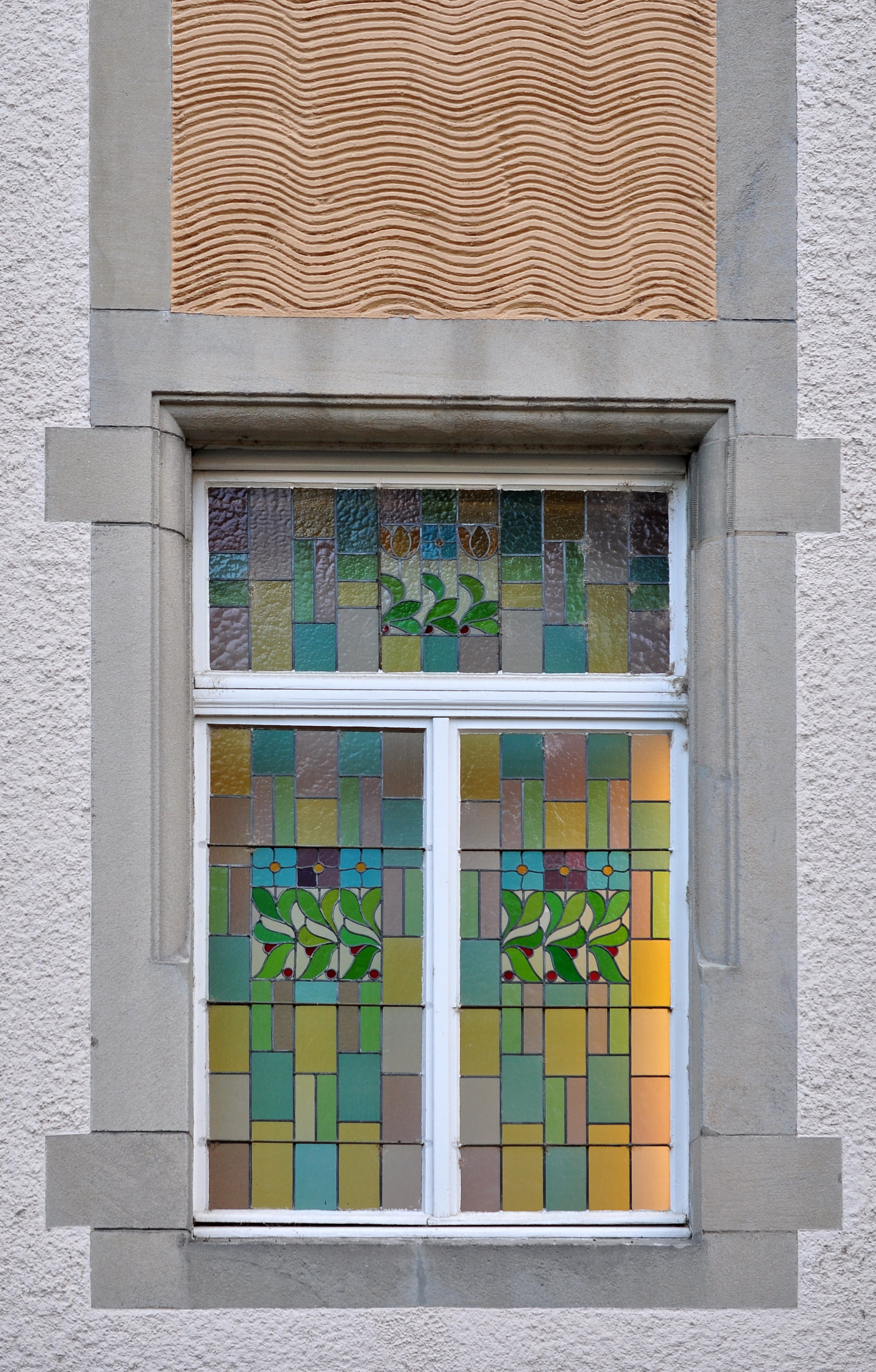
Blindekuh in Zurich

blindekuh in Basel and Zurich

blindekuh are two restaurants in Switzerland where patrons are served in the dark. The restaurants are located in Basel and Zurich, respectively. The name is derived from "Blinde Kuh" (lit. 'blind cow'), the German name for Blind man's bluff.

== Concept ==
No lights are allowed inside a blindekuh. Patrons are served by blind and visually impaired people. Both locations offer cultural events such as readings or concerts in the dark.

The dark restaurants are a project of the Blind-Liecht (Swiss German for blind-light) foundation. The foundation works to create employment opportunities for blind and visually impaired people. Their first venture, the blindekuh in Zurich, opened on September 17, 1999 and is claimed to be the world's first dark restaurant. The second location opened in Spring 2005 in Basel.

blindekuh won several awards, among them the Social Innovations Award of the Institute for Social Innovations in London.

The restaurant concept has subsequently been replicated elsewhere, including in London, Paris, Sydney, Amsterdam, Tel Aviv, Beijing, and Vancouver as restaurants and multiple cities in the United States as special events.

== Social Impact ==
The restaurants have impacted the social experience of disability by inverting the status of blind or visually impaired people and sighted people within the context of dining. While it acts as a liminal exploration of the experience of blindness, it does not fully simulate the experience of blindness for sighted people.

== See also ==
- List of restaurants in Switzerland
- Black Restaurant (Japan)
- Dans le Noir (France)
