= Adena =

Adena may refer to:

== People ==
- Adena (name), or Adeena, including a list of people with the name
- Adena (musician), Romanian singer-songwriter

== Places ==
=== United States ===
==== Communities ====
- Adena, Colorado, a ghost town
- Adena, Ohio, a village
- Adena Pointe, Ohio, an unincorporated community
- Adena culture, a mound-building Native American culture
  - Adena mound, a type site for the Adena culture, near Chillicothe, Ohio, US

==== Buildings and landmarks ====
- Adena Court Apartments, Zanesville, Ohio
- Adena High School, Frankfort, Ohio
- Adena Mansion, Chillicothe, Ohio
- Adena Springs, a Thoroughbred horse breeding operation in Paris, Kentucky
- Adena Springs Ranch, a former cattle ranch in Marion County, Florida

=== Eritrea ===
- Adena, a village in Berikh subregion, central Maekel region of Eritrea
- Adena, a village in Logo Anseba subregion, eastern Gash-Barka region of Eritrea

== Organizations ==
- ADENA, Asociación para la Defensa de la Naturaleza, old name of WWF Spain
