= Mirchi and Mime =

- Interactive map of Mirchi and Mime

Restaurant information
- Established: 2 May 2015
- Owner: Private limited company
- Dress code: Smart casual
- Location: Trans Ocean House, Lake Boulevard, Hiranandani Business Park, Powai, Mumbai, Maharashtra, 400076, India
- Seating capacity: 88
- Website: mirchiandmime.com

Mirchi and Mime was a local restaurant located in Powai, Mumbai, in the Indian state of Maharashtra. Its staff chiefly consisted of people with hearing and speech disability. Most of the activities were undertaken by the staff who communicated with the patrons through sign language, images of whose variations accompanied every item in the food menu.

== History ==
Mirchi and Mime was set up in March 2015, and the idea conceived by two serial entrepreneur-investors. It was shut down in July 2020 as a direct effect of the COVID-19 pandemic. However post pandemic, it was revived, and it re-opened soon after the post-Covid unlock on 5 Oct 2020.

== Functioning ==
Mirchi and Mime only employed people who are hearing- and speech-impaired. Diners were requested to place their orders by mimicking hand-gestures associated with a particular food item. Items in the food menu were accompanied with photos of these hand gestures. The food menu matrix, which lists all food items in a single page along with the images, was designed by Chaitanya Modak from Inhouse Design, an alumnus of India's National Institute of Design. The staff were trained by Dr. Reddy's Foundation.

== See also ==
- Dark dining
