= Magatte =

Magatte is a given name. Notable people with the name include:

- Magatte Sarr (born 1999), French association football player
- Magatte Wade
- Pape Magatte Kebe, Senegalese footballer

== See also ==
- Magat
- Margate
- Margaret
