= Adena (given name) =

Adena or Adeena is a female given name, and may refer to:

- Adeena Karasick (born 1965), Canadian poet, performance artist, and essayist
- Adena (musician), Romanian singer-songwriter
- Adena Friedman (born 1969), American businesswoman
- Adena Halpern (born 1968), American author
- Adena Ishii, American politician
- Adena Jacobs (born 1982), Australian theatre director
- Adena Miller Rich (1888–1967), American social worker, philanthropist, and activist
- Adena Williams Loston (born 1952), American college president

== See also ==
- Adena (disambiguation)
- Adina (given name)
