= Edina =

Edina may refer to:

== Places ==
- Edina, Liberia
- Edina, Minnesota
  - Edina Realty
  - Edina Library
  - Edina High School
  - Edina Public Schools
  - Galleria Edina
  - Edina Mill
- Edina, Missouri
  - Edina Double Square Historic District
- Edinburgh, as referred to by Scots poets
- The Komenda/Edina/Eguafo/Abirem District in Ghana
  - Elmina, Ghana, traditional name

== Other uses ==
- EDINA, the JISC-funded UK data centre
- Edina (given name)
- Edina, an 1876 novel by Mrs. Henry Wood

== See also ==
- Edin
- Edwina
