= Blindfolded tourism =

Blindfolded tourism (also cecitourism) is a form of experimental travel, consisting of a guided tour in which the tourist is blindfolded while being talked through the visited areas, as opposed to traditional sightseeing. A blind tour is a different experience owing to the absence of one vital sense, sight, thereby stimulating the other relevant senses, namely hearing, feel and smell. The concept has been related to that of the dark restaurant, where there is no light for diners to see what they eat.

A "blindfold tour" to savour the smells of the City of London was proposed as far back as 1970. More recently, blindfolded tours have been offered in a range of mainly urban locations, including tours of Prague Castle, Tirana in Albania, Vancouver, and the Alfama quarter of Lisbon. The German artist Christian Jankowski has undertaken two blind tours: one in Dubai and one in Montevideo, where he led a group of blindfolded journalists.

In some cases a blind tour may involve offering the tourist a video of their tour following completion of the tour.

== See also ==
- Sensory deprivation
