= Edina Altara =

Italian illustrator, decorative artist, painter and designer

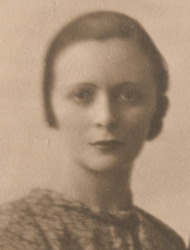
- Born: 9 July 1898; Sassari, Kingdom of Italy
- Died: 11 April 1983 (aged 84); Lanusei, Italy
- Known for: Illustration, decorative arts, painting, design
- Movement: Art Deco
- Spouse: Vittorio Accornero de Testa

Edina Altara (9 July 1898 – 11 April 1983) was an Italian illustrator, decorative artist, painter and designer. A self-taught artist, she worked in collage, book and magazine illustration, advertising graphics, fashion, ceramic decoration, reverse painting on glass and interior design. Active in Sardinia, Piedmont and Milan, she collaborated at different stages of her career with the illustrator Vittorio Accornero de Testa and the architect and designer Gio Ponti.

== Early life and education ==
Altara was born and raised in Sassari, the third of four sisters: Aurora, Lavinia, Edina and Iride. Her father, Eugenio Altara, was an ophthalmologist originally from Bitti, while her mother, Gavina Campus, came from a wealthy family in Pattada. Following her parents' separation, Altara grew up in a predominantly female household. She attended only elementary school and received no formal artistic training.

From childhood she showed a strong interest in drawing, paper cutting and the construction of paper figures. In 1908 she sent her father a series of small drawings depicting her mother on different social and domestic occasions, recording her clothes, accessories and poses. These childhood works anticipated Altara's later interest in fashion, the female figure and theatrical composition.

Around 1915, the Sassari-born painter Giuseppe Biasi, a family friend, recognised her abilities and encouraged her to pursue her artistic work. Altara initially focused on collage, using coloured paper, fabric and other applied materials to create highly stylised, two-dimensional images.

== Collages and paper toys ==
In 1916 Altara took part in the first Sardinian Art Exhibition in Sassari, held as part of wartime civilian mobilisation initiatives. She exhibited collages and toys made from paper and cardboard, attracting critical attention. In the same year, she participated in the Toy Trade Exhibition in Milan, where she displayed small constructions inspired mainly by figures and scenes from Sardinian popular life.

Her toys, which are now known mainly through period photographs, included children, animals, musicians, women at wells and other figures assembled as small movable stage sets. Her work was discussed by critics including Vittorio Pica, Raffaello Giolli and Margherita Sarfatti. The sculptor Leonardo Bistolfi also expressed his appreciation of her work.

In 1917 Altara participated in the 19th exhibition of the Società degli Amici dell'Arte in Turin with four works described as "paper mosaics": Il vespero, Il bagno, High Life and Gesus salvadelu. The last of these, created in 1916 and also known as Nella terra degli intrepidi sardi, was purchased by King Victor Emmanuel III of Italy and entered the art collections of the Quirinal Palace.

== Paola Lombroso and the rural libraries ==
In 1917 Altara began working with Paola Lombroso Carrara, known by the pen name Zia Mariù, who promoted small rural libraries for children. For Lombroso's fundraising initiatives, Altara produced postcards, calendars, cut-out figures and other illustrated material. Lombroso affectionately nicknamed her Edina Forbicicchia, referring to her skill with scissors and paper.

In 1920 she made her debut as an illustrator in Il giornalino della Domenica. Her editorial work led her to adapt the concise visual language of her early collages to children's storytelling, developing a more fluid and elaborate drawing style.

At the Sardinian art exhibition held in Cagliari in 1921, Altara was given a room of her own, where she exhibited collages, toys and decorative works. She was also a member of both the executive committee and the jury, and was the only woman serving on bodies otherwise composed of male artists and intellectuals.

== Marriage and collaboration with Vittorio Accornero ==
In Casale Monferrato, Altara met Vittorio Accornero de Testa, an illustrator who also worked under the names Victor Max Ninon and Ninon. They married in 1922 and collaborated on illustrations, postcards, books and advertising material. Some of their joint works were signed "Edina e Ninon".

Their graphic style reflected the international language of Art Deco, particularly in its elongated figures, attention to clothing and elaborate theatrical settings. The division of labour varied from one work to another. In some cases Altara was mainly responsible for the figures and Accornero for the backgrounds, while in other works their respective contributions are more difficult to distinguish.

The couple separated in 1934. Altara continued her career independently in Milan, exploring new professional fields and opening an atelier in her home where she designed clothes, household linen and embroidered furnishings.

== Illustration, publishing and graphic design ==
=== Children's books ===
Book illustration formed a substantial and continuous part of Altara's career. Following her early work with Paola Lombroso and her debut in Il giornalino della Domenica, she illustrated stories, fairy tales and books intended mainly for children and young readers.

Over the course of her career, Altara illustrated approximately thirty children's books. One of her most representative works was Il libro giocattoli ("The Toy Book"), published by Hoepli in 1945. In the book she returned to her early interest in paper figures designed to be cut out, assembled and used as toys.

In 1971 she illustrated S. Fiocchi's Quattro favole, regarded as the last known book in her publishing career.

=== Magazines and periodicals ===
Altara contributed to numerous magazines and periodicals, producing narrative illustrations, fashion drawings, covers, decorative motifs and advertising images.

Publications to which she contributed included La Sorgente, In Penombra, Rivista Sarda, Il giornalino della Domenica, Cuor d'oro, La Donna, Giornale dei Balilla, Noi e il mondo, Lidel, Fantasie d'Italia, Scena illustrata, Per voi Signora, Bellezza, Rakam, Grazia, La Lettura, Fili Moda, Fili. Rivista mensile dei lavori d'ago, Sovrana, La Fiaccola and Il Secolo XX.

From 1941 to 1943 she contributed fashion illustrations to Grazia. In 1942 she began working for Bellezza, a high-fashion magazine directed by Gio Ponti.

=== Postcards, calendars and advertising ===
Alongside her work in books and periodicals, Altara produced illustrated postcards, calendars and advertising material. During the 1920s and 1930s she worked for publishers and specialist firms including Degami, Cecami and N.M.M.

She also designed small promotional calendars, including the type commonly known in Italy as the calendarietto da barbiere, for cosmetics and perfume companies. Documented clients included Viset in 1923, 1924 and 1928; Caleri in 1925; Gi.Vi.Emme in 1928; Bertelli in 1939, 1950 and 1951; and Valli in 1941 and 1942.

== Ceramics and fashion ==
Altara's collaboration with Margelli, a Sassari jewellery and gift shop, is documented from at least 1932. Margelli commissioned pieces based on Altara's designs from Minardi's Manifattura Ceramiche Faentine and, on occasion, from the Lenci factory.

Altara did not manufacture the ceramics herself, but produced designs for plates, bowls and tiles. The subjects mainly depicted Sardinian figures and scenes, although traditional clothing was reinterpreted through contemporary fashion and a modern graphic style.

The plate entitled A convegno is among the works documented as having been produced by Lenci. Designs made for the Faenza factory were reproduced both as plates of different sizes and as tiles, meaning that the same composition could appear on several formats and supports.

The designs were often created as collages and then transferred to ceramic surfaces using the pouncing technique. The resulting compositions were characterised by stylised figures, clearly defined areas of colour and a high degree of visual simplification.

To reduce the cost of production in Faenza, Altara also developed a so-called "cold" technique, in which synthetic paints or varnishes were applied to industrial ceramic supports already glazed in white. Her sisters Iride and Lavinia helped reproduce her designs, creating a small family-based production that continued into the 1950s.

The cold-painted tiles mainly depicted isolated female figures, mothers with children and figures in Sardinian dress. Male subjects were less common. The works were sold not only through Margelli's shop but also through the Arte Sarda Ferrigno shop in La Maddalena.

At the same time, Altara continued to work in fashion. After her separation from Accornero, she opened an atelier in her Milan home, serving a middle-class clientele and designing clothes, trousseaux, embroideries and household linen.

== Collaboration with Gio Ponti ==
Altara's professional relationship with Gio Ponti, which began through Bellezza, expanded after the Second World War from graphic and fashion design to the decoration of interiors, furniture, doors, panels and glass surfaces.

She developed a particular interest in reverse painting on glass. In this technique, the image is painted on the rear surface of the glass and must be executed in the reverse order from that in which it will be seen from the front.

For the Dulciora confectionery shop in Milan, Altara produced glass decorations featuring figures, garlands and imagery inspired by sweets and confectionery. She also contributed to the interiors of several Italian ocean liners, including the Conte Grande, the Conte Biancamano and the Oceania.

For the Conte Grande, she created Allegoria del viaggiare ("Allegory of Travel") in 1950, a large oil-on-glass panel connected with Gio Ponti's interior design. For the Conte Biancamano, she produced panels depicting figures wearing the traditional costumes of the Italian regions.

Two painted glass panels from the motor ship Oceania, entitled Nettuno e allegoria della terra and Anfitrite e allegoria del mare, later entered the collections of the Pinacoteca nazionale di Sassari.

One of the principal results of Altara's collaboration with Ponti was her contribution to Casa Lucano in Milan, presented in Domus in 1952 as a casa di fantasia, or "house of fantasy".

Altara produced painted glass doors representing Athena and Bacchus, chests of drawers decorated with episodes from the Odyssey, and painted overdoors. Her compositions brought figures from classical mythology into the domestic interior, combining narrative, decoration and perspectival illusion.

Ponti devoted an article to Altara in issue 270 of Domus, published in May 1952, emphasising her ability to transform surfaces and furnishings into figurative narratives.

== Mature work and final years ==
During the 1950s Altara also painted on Masonite, slate and other supports. Works from this period include Penelope, I ragazzi che vanno alla guerra, Il ratto d'Europa, Salomè and Matrimonio a Oliena.

In these paintings she revisited classical, biblical and popular themes through a narrative and decorative style.

During the 1960s she returned to collage, using cuttings from fashion plates, 19th-century prints and devotional images to construct interiors crowded with furniture, curtains, pictures and small figures.

She also created compositions known as Altarini, a name derived from her surname and from the Italian word for small altars. These were small devotional objects made from cut-out images, acid-etched mirrors, fabrics, ribbons, painted flowers and other materials.

In 1974 Altara left Milan and returned permanently to Sardinia. She died in Lanusei on 11 April 1983.

== Works in public collections ==
Works by Altara held in public collections include:

- Nella terra degli intrepidi sardi – Gesus salvadelu (1916), a coloured-paper collage in the collections of the Quirinal Palace;
- S'isposa (1919), a coloured-paper collage in the collection of the MAN – Museo d'arte della Provincia di Nuoro;
- the painted glass panels Nettuno e allegoria della terra and Anfitrite e allegoria del mare, originally created for the motor ship Oceania and now in the Pinacoteca nazionale di Sassari;
- collages, ceramic tiles, painted glass panels and other works held by the Pinacoteca nazionale di Sassari.

== Bibliography ==
- Pica, Vittorio (1917). "Tre giovani artisti della Sardegna". Emporium (in Italian). 46 (272): 3–17.
- Altea, Giuliana (2005). Edina Altara (in Italian). Nuoro: Ilisso. ISBN 8889188383.
- Scarlini, Luca, ed. (2021). Vittorio Accornero, Edina Altara. Gruppo di famiglia con immagini (in Italian). Cinisello Balsamo: Silvana Editoriale. ISBN 9788836647941.
- Altea, Giuliana (2025). Edina Altara (in Italian). Nuoro: Ilisso. ISBN 9788862024747.

== See also ==
- Giuseppe Biasi
- Vittorio Accornero de Testa
- Gio Ponti
- Art of Sardinia
- Illustration
- Art Deco
