= Idina =

Idina is a female first name. Notable people with the name include:

- Idina Menzel (born 1971), American actress, singer, and songwriter
- Lady Idina Sackville (1893–1955), British aristocrat

== See also ==
- Adina (given name)
- Dina (given name)
- Edina (name)
