= Magat =

Magat may refer to:

- Magat River, in the Philippines
  - Magat Dam, on the river
- MAGAt, or magat, derogatory term (a pun of maggot) for a supporter of Donald Trump, from the slogan "Make America Great Again" (MAGA)

== People ==
- Krisztina Magát, Hungarian weightlifter
- Magat Salamat, son of Lakan Dula of the Kingdom of Tondo (Philippines, 16th century)
- Marion Magat, Filipino basketball player

== See also ==
- BRP Magat Salamat (PS-20), a Philippine Navy vessel named after the historic figure
- Magatte
