= Adina Deer Park =

- wildlife sanctuary
- Location in West Bengal, India
- Coordinates: 25.1405°N 88.1727°E
- Country: India
- State: West Bengal

Languages
  - Official: Bengali, English
- Time zone: UTC+5:30 (IST)

Adina Deer Park is located in Malda district of West Bengal and lies 21 kilometres from the city of Malda. The park is an important breeding centre for cheetal or spotted deer in the state and sometimes they overflow in number. The park also has a nilgai population. However, in spite of its name, the deer park is a small fraction of the area and protected within an orchard plantation. The woods are rich in butterfly and birds, specially Asian openbill, paradise flycatcher, prinia, oriole, fish eagle, etc.
