= Lenci =

Lenci may refer to:

- Pablo Lenci (born 1972), former Argentine footballer
- Francesco Lenci
- Ivaldo Lenci Sr. (born 1945), American politician
- Ruggero Lenci (born 1955), Italian architect
- Sergio Lenci (1927–2001), Italian architect
- Lenci dolls felt doll makers from Turin.
