= Adinah, Yemen =

ʿAdinah عدينه
- Sub-district
- Location in Yemen
- Coordinates: 13°29′35″N 43°51′45″E
- Country: Yemen
- Governorate: Taiz Governorate
- District: Jabal Habashi District
- Elevation: 1,869 m (6,132 ft)

Population (2004)
  - Total: 9,019
- Time zone: UTC+3

Adinah (Arabic: عدينه) is a sub-district located in the Jabal Habashi District, Taiz Governorate, Yemen. ʿAdinah had a population of 9,019 according to the 2004 census.
