= Adena Court Apartments =

Historic building in Ohio, United States

- U.S. National Register of Historic Places
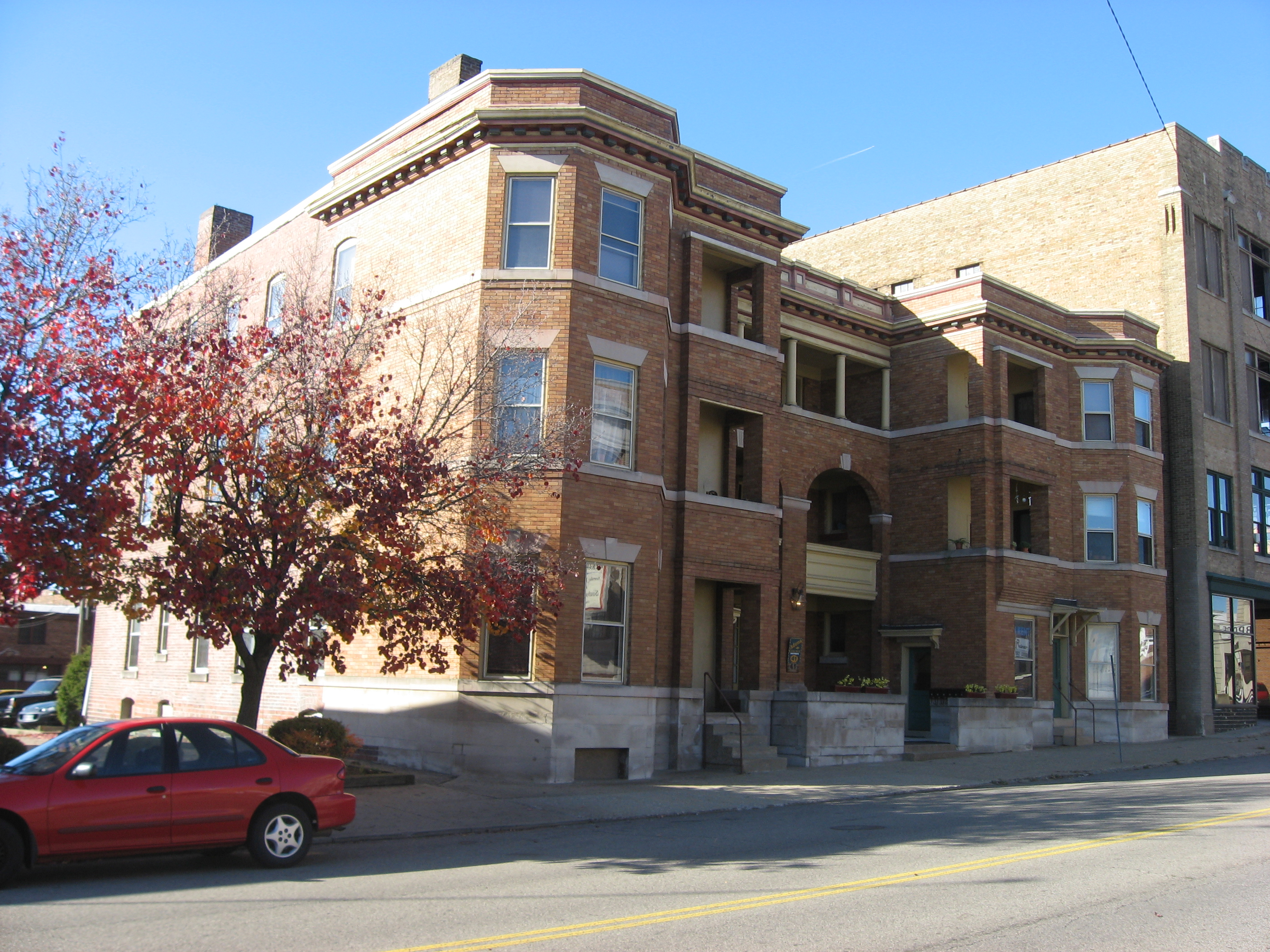
- Front of the apartments

- Location within Ohio Location within the United States
- Location: 41 S. 4th St., Zanesville, Ohio
- Coordinates: 39°56′22″N 82°0′29″W
- Area: less than one acre
- Built: 1906
- Architectural style: Colonial Revival
- NRHP reference No.: 80003190
- Added to NRHP: September 27, 1980

The Adena Court Apartments are an apartment building in downtown Zanesville, Ohio, United States. Built in 1906, the apartments are a well-preserved example of the Colonial Revival style of architecture of the early twentieth century.

This three-story apartment building was built for Charles M. Lenhart, a Zanesfield doctor. Born in the countryside of Muskingum County, Lenhart was a leading physician at two Zanesfield hospitals, as well as maintaining his own practice on South Fourth Street in downtown. Consequently, when he decided to erect an apartment building, it was constructed to accommodate his older property; the core of the building is Lenhart's house-and-office building. The unknown architect that he hired to design this structure employed brick for the exterior, along with details of stone and metal. With the structure complete, Lenhart and his family moved into one of the apartments, while another part of the building became his office.

In 1980, the Adena Court Apartments were listed on the National Register of Historic Places because of their well-preserved historic architecture.
