= Addlove =

Chinese bakery chain

Sichuan Addlove Food Co., Ltd.
- Traditional Chinese: 四川愛達樂食品有限公司
- Simplified Chinese: 四川爱达乐食品有限公司
Transcriptions
Standard Mandarin
- Hanyu Pinyin: Sìchuān Àidálè Shípǐn Yǒuxiàngōngsī

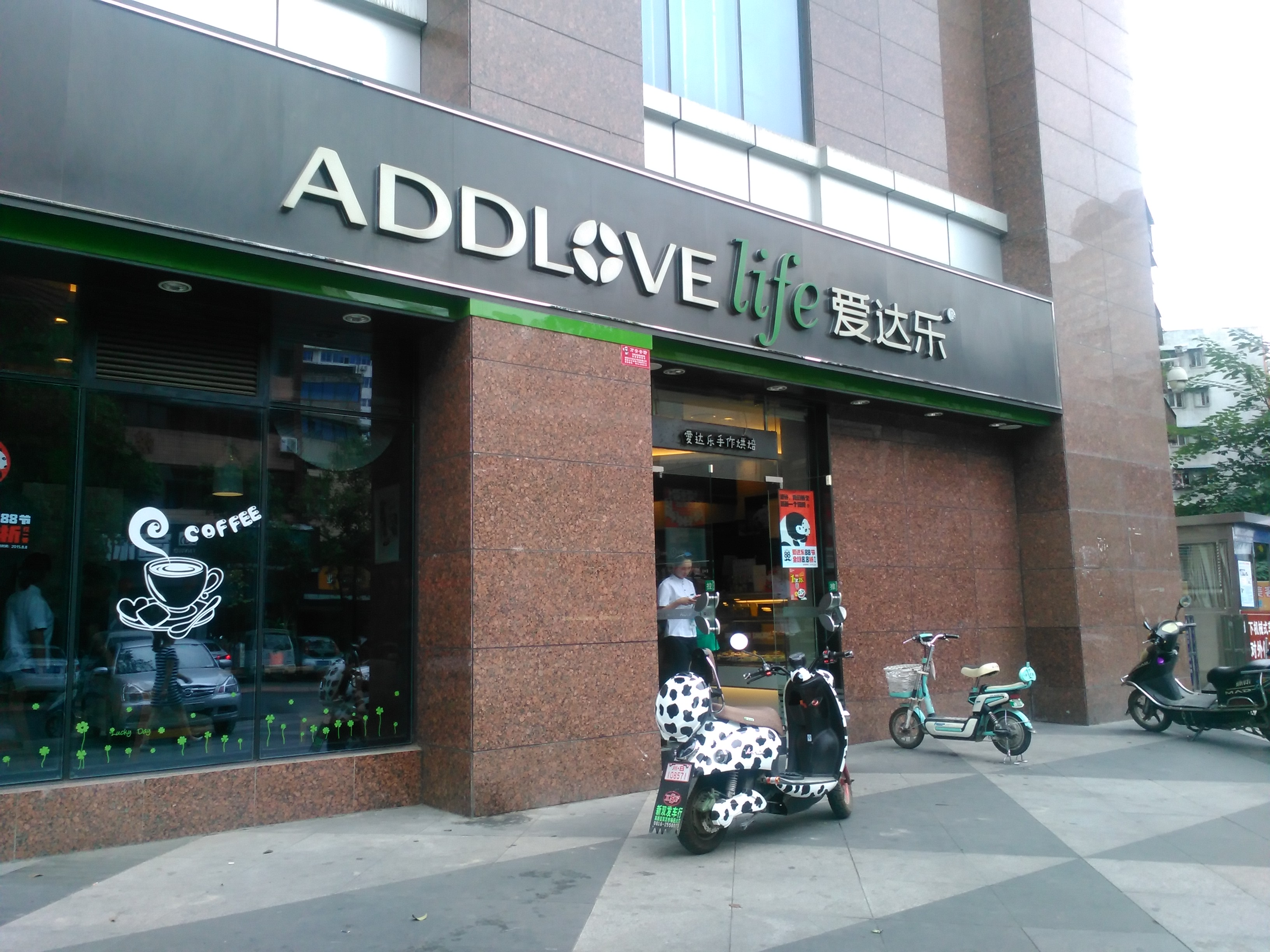
Addlove store in Mianyang

Addlove (simplified Chinese: 爱达乐; traditional Chinese: 愛達樂; pinyin: Àidálè) is a Chinese bakery chain, with headquarters in Deyang, Sichuan and offices in Chengdu and Mianyang.

It was established in September 1996. As of 2009 it had over 70 restaurants. It formerly had the English name Adina.
