= Adina's Deck =

- poster from 2008 series premiere
- Adina's Deck
- Directed by: Jason Azicri; Debbie Heimowitz
- Written by: Jason Azicri
- Produced by: Debbie Heimowitz
- Starring: Amelia Varni; Ciera Trussell; Kelcie Stranahan; Stephanie Cameron
- Cinematography: Jessica Young
- Edited by: Jamison Boyer; Marvin Lee; Wes Sneeringer
- Music by: Bruce Drummond; Kimberly Hinkley; Chris Smith
- Production company: DMH Productions
- Release date: July 28, 2007 (Palo Alto, California)
- Running time: 30 minutes each
- Country: United States
- Language: English

Adina's Deck is a 2007 American DVD film series about internet safety and aimed toward 9- to 15-year-old children. The series is intended to be used alongside the series' official website and curriculum to inform and instruct children about cyberbullying and how to prevent it. The series was directed and written by Jason Azicri and Debbie Heimowitz, and was evaluated by Stanford University for its suitability as a teaching aid.

== Synopsis ==
The series follows four girls who form a club to help their peers with mysteries by using technology.

=== Skye’s Cyber Bullying Mystery ===
When Skye (Kelcie Stranahan), the most popular girl in the 8th grade, starts to receive threatening emails, text messages and voice-mails, she doesn't know what to do. Her best friend Melody (Stephanie Cameron) asks the tech-savvy Adina (Amelia Varni) for help. When Adina says yes, her friend Clara (Cierra Trussell) is confused. Skye is stuck up, and has never been nice to them in the past, so why is Adina helping her? After an adventure, the girls learn about more than just the bully's identity—they learn about friendship and growing up in the digital age of technology.

=== The Case of the Online Crush ===
Michael (Sam Ison), a concerned 8th grader, approaches the Club with a difficult problem. His friend Ally (Nyssa Smikoski) has been talking to a guy online for over two months and it seems too good to be true—except the guy is 21! The club takes the case to track down Ally’s mysterious boyfriend and uncover his true identity. After using technology and their detective sleuth skills, the club learns that young online relationships aren’t as romantic as they might seem.

=== The Case of the Plagiarized Paper ===
Dave (Kyle Fitz), a fellow 7th grade classmate needs help from the Club (Adina's deck). Someone in Mr. B’s class plagiarized their own paper and since Mr. B has a bell curve it affects everyone. Dave’s grade got lowered and that means if his parents find out about it, they will be sending him to boarding school. Adina’s Deck takes the case in order to help Dave get the grade he deserves. In this who-done-it, there are four main suspects, and the club needs to investigate each paper to catch the cheater and save Dave . After a difficult case, the club learns about the true nature of plagiarism and that doing things right the first time just might be a trustworthy solution.

== Cast ==
Main cast:

- Amelia Varni as Adina
- Ciera Trussell as Clara
- Kelcie Stranahan as Skye
- Stephanie Cameron as Melody
- Samuel Ison as Michael
- Cassie Jo Fastabend as Eve
- Nyssa Smikoski as Ally
- Kyle Fitz as David
- David Valladeres as Christian
- Jamin Shih as Scott
- KJ Forbes as Assistant Principal Klein
- Avery Monsen as Tommy

== Recognition ==
The film has been used as resource in books, such as:

- Cyber Bullying: A Prevention Curriculum for Grades 3-5, by Susan P. Limber, PD.D., Sue Limber, Robin M. Kowalski, Patricia W. Agatston, ISBN 1592857159
- Bullying Beyond the Schoolyard: Preventing and Responding to Cyberbullying by Sameer Hinduja, Justin W. Patchi, ISBN 1412966892
- Discovering Computers Fundamentals: Your Interactive Guide to the Digital World, by Gary Shelly, Misty Vermaat, ISBN 1111530459
- Bullying Under Attack: True Stories Written by Teen Victims, Bullies & Bystanders, by Stephanie H. Meyer, John Meyer, Emily Sperber, ISBN 075731760X

and in multiple scholarly dissertations.

=== Awards ===
- 2008, Won Best Short Film at the International Family Film Festival
- 2008, Won Best Educational Film at the International Family Film Festival

== See also ==
- Cyberbullying
