= Black Restaurant =

Black Restaurant known as Kurayami-gohan (a meal in the darkness) is an irregular event in which the non-profit organization SIEN (a cultural exchange group in Japan since 1997) and Higan-ji (a virtual Buddhist temple created by Japanese monks) cooperate at Ryokusen-ji, a temple in Asakusa. SIEN first introduced the concept of a “blind restaurant,” which has since spread abroad (Blinde Kuh), and is now known in Japan as “Black Restaurant”.

== Information ==
Higan-ji(彼岸寺) & SIEN(彩の国国際交流ネットーワーク) ■Location: Ryokusen-ji (緑泉寺), 1-8-5 Nishi-Asakusa, Taito ward, Tokyo.

== See also ==
- Dans le Noir
