= Adina Bar-On =

Israeli artist (born 1951)

Adina Bar-On עדינה בר-און
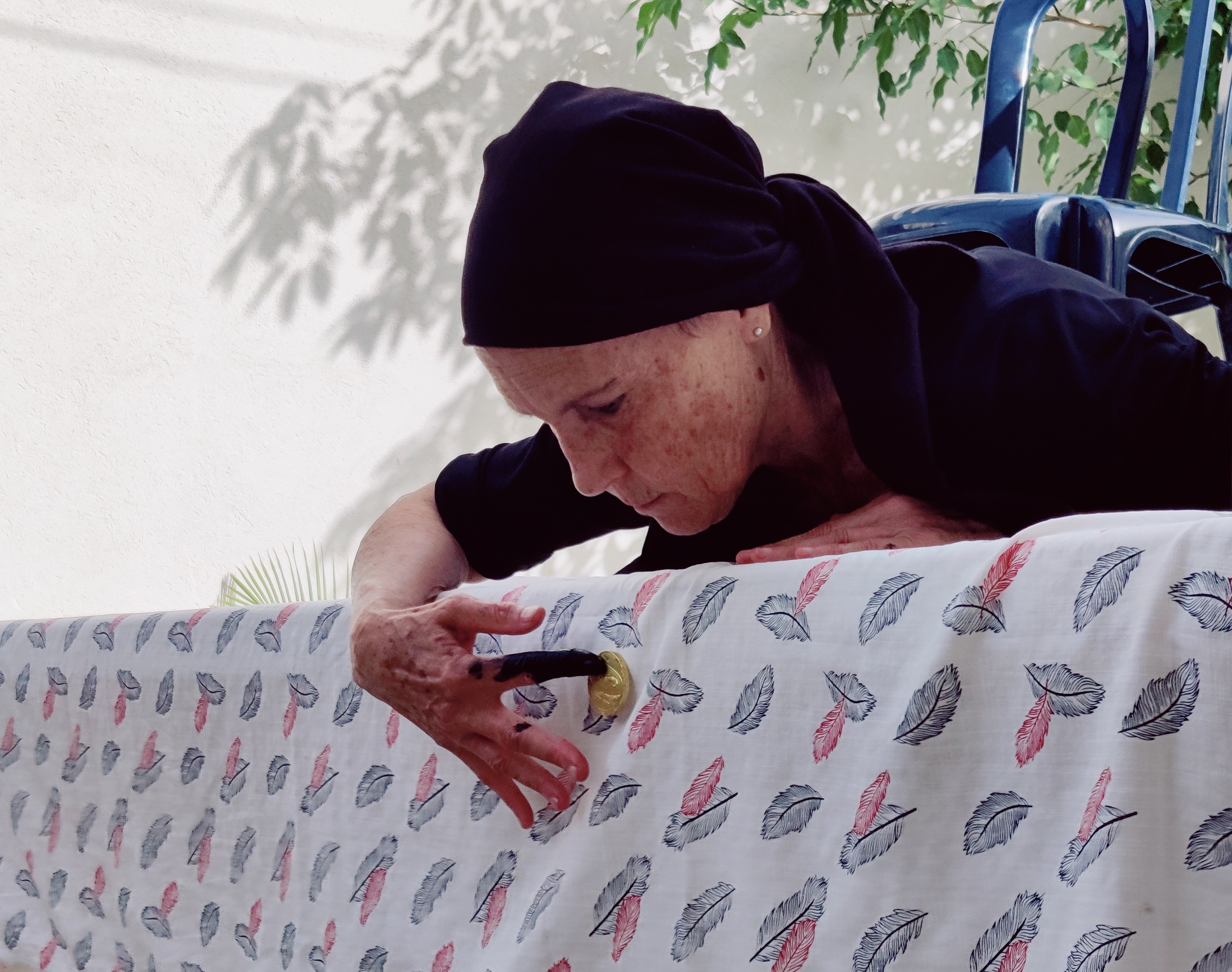
- Born: December 19, 1951 (age 74); Tel Aviv, Israel
- Education: Bezalel Academy of Art and Design
- Known for: Performance Art
- Notable work: First Performance at Bezalel (1973); The Woman of the Pots Performance & Video (1990–1991); Sacrifice (1991-2011); No Matter (2013)
- Movement: Contextual art

Adina Bar-On (Hebrew: עדינה בר-און; born December 19, 1951), in Kibbutz Kfar Blum, Israel, is a pioneer performance artist, considered to be the first performance artist in Israel.

Active for four decades, Bar-On's work continuously explores the relationship between identity and presence, and most importantly "conflict of identity and conflicting identities". Her performances consist of unique use of human body and voice expression, close to modern dance and experimental sound techniques. Adina's work emphasizes strong connection of art and non-structural ethics of behavior, and introduces it by activating audience's high levels of attention and consciousness.

== Early work ==
Bar-On began her first performances in the early 1973 as a third year student at the Bezalel Academy of Art and Design. Bar-On is now a performance art teacher at Bezalel Academy's Visual Arts Department. Bar-On studied to become a painter, although was deeply involved in conceptual art movement. Her early performances took place when the notion of "performance" as a medium of art expression was not yet known in Israel. Her first performances were still called "shows"and the invitations for these events were only saying her name, time and place of the event. Those days most art critics considered performance to be a junk-art, this genre of art was not understood nor acknowledged by art historians and critics.

== Controversy ==
After the first performance at the courtyard of Bezalel Academy in Jerusalem, Bar-On was asked to stop doing this kind of things and academy professors called a school psychologist to examine the performer and to express professional opinion about the work. After the second performance, "Birds" (June–July 1973), Adina received a warning letter from the directors on te Academy, informing that if she wants to continue to study she has to go back to conventional mediums.

== Family background ==
Bar-On's parents were Zionist American Jews who came to Israel at the beginning of this state, to set a country for a free nation to live in their own state (not in a ghetto in other nations' state). They did not come from Europe and did not escape from after-Holocaust Germany or Eastern Europe, but from free country of USA. Adina Bar-On was born in kibbutz, and after some years in Israel went to America to go to secondary school. She later conceptualized her identity status in a talk "Is my Performance an Israeli Culture Manifestation?" in 2011 at Dar al- Kalima College of Art, Bethlehem.

== Influences ==
At the Bezalel Academy (then in the center of Jerusalem, now on the Mount Scopus) Adina was focused on painting and studied conceptual art, which was becoming the most important approach in contemporary practice. During the seventies she was interested mostly in new forms of communication art and her work was influenced by American happenings, Joseph Beuys, Tadeusz Kantor, Jerzy Grotowski, the new theater (as defined by Michael Kirby), Vito Acconci.

Bar-On found inspiration for her aesthetics in film, precisely in Giulietta Masina's actors work, as well as in the new manner introduced by Fellini, Antonioni and Godard of seeing film-life (art-life) relationship problem. She studied dance for some time and experimented with mime (an episode in Swiss mime actor and clown Dimitri in 1976 at the Dimitri School of Theatre, Vercio, Switzerland).

During these years Adina worked as therapeutist, social worker, gave courses for school art teachers, as well as performed in many different contexts: at the industry for workers, old people's houses, nurseries, private homes. Her work was described as "strong" and "subtle" at the same time (her name, "Adina Bar-On", in Hebrew means "delicate with power") and some people recognized her new aesthetics, exceptional way of creating art as a means of human communication.

She was 23 years old when she decided to complete her academic diploma at the Bezalel despite the professors' "advice" to quit making performances, and she prepared a special, highly conceptual photographic work (black and white photographs of her color, post-expressionist paintings hung on the walls of a middle class conservative Israeli living room of her mother's house). This work already signaled some of the subjects she will be exploring later: public and private, black-and-white and color, representation and performance.

In 1974 Adina Bar-On married Daniel Davis, a potter and author of Judaica art, with whom she later often worked on some of her performances (ex. A Woman of the Pots), and made her private life a subject of the art work. Their children, Shahar Davis and Yasmin Davis, were also engaged in the preparation of "Woman of the Pots". Bar-On wrote in 2000 about a necessity and ethical motivation of her work: "I felt that art was losing its connection with what characterizes the human being, the ability to connect intellect with emotions".

== Selected performances ==
=== "Performance", 1973 ===
Adina's first performance took place in the plaza of old Bezalel Academy building, in early May 1973. Going beyond contemporary aesthetics, risking social position and artistic status, extending possibilities of communication - all these interpretations of Adina Bar-On's early performance places it on the border between avant-garde art and post-artistic performance art practice. An incident of being mistaken for a mentally ill by Academy professors (other artists, see: section "Controversy"), showed Bar-On that her performance was indeed touching a deep level of human psyche of the audience and caused an aesthetic shock of a certain kind. At the time, most of the interpretations of art history, even aware of anti-psychiatric movement in Europe, psychoanalytical writings about Antonin Artaud, experience with surrealism, counterculture movement, Beuys's idea of social sculpture etc., were only taken intellectually, and misunderstood. Adina's experiment was recognized by the audience: "Very, very strong. (...) I am stired by the approach which I think should guide all of us - to touch the truth, and not in all kinds of formal, aesthetic, etc., pseudo-intellectiuallism. I don't know what art is, for I've heard from "professional connoisseurs" that this is not art. ( ... ) And I don't care if it is or it is not if art does touch upon these problems but in a different way that enables distance, form, material, causality, inner logic (formal as well)." (Fragments of a letter Adina Bar-On received after the performance).

=== "Walking On a Thin Line", 1979 ===
In this performance was prepared in collaboration with Ronit Land (Israeli dancer and choreographer, disciple of Merce Cunningham and Anna Halprin) as movement consultant. It was performed at The Israel Museum of Art, Jerusalem, as well as at the Tel-Hai '80, a contemporary art event.

=== "Salute", 1983 ===
Working in a collaboration with Ronit Land, this time Bar-On prepared a theatrical performance, moving on the edge of modern dance, theatre expression and performance art. Daniel Davis's environmental design was introduced. The premiere took place at Tel Hai, 83, Contemporary Art Event.

=== "On Getting High", 1986 ===
"Getting high" as a goal of theater and ritual throughout the ages, the idea of inexpressible, were motifs of this six scenes of movement-play performance. Musical part of the performance involved early computer-based composition (using 3 connected synthesiser) composed by Yossi Marchaim and wordless vocalization of Adina and Robert Flantz.

=== "Woman of the Pots", 1990–1991 ===
One of Bar-On's masterpieces, combining image, movement/dance and voice interplay. Originally performed In 1990 performance was filmed by Naomi Perlov and screened at Israel Museum. Playing with an important Israeli iconographical motive, "Woman of the Pots" was a most important collaboration with Daniel Davis.

==== Leaving "Acconci dilemma" ====
At this phase of Bar-On's development an important methodological change was: leaving art as conceptual art, and leading towards contextual art (everyday life questions raised to be subjects of the art). Saying that she left "the Acconci Vito Acconci dilemma" in performance art, Bar-On emphasised the need for new approach in performance art, where strong relations between art and life should be introduced when talking about live-art paradigm.

=== Breath, 1994 ===
Performed in The Tel Aviv Museum of Art Tel Aviv Museum of Art. Video work for the performance was prepared by Alon Eilat.

=== "Sacrifice", 1991 ===
Based on an experimental voicework (recorded and mastered later in ToTamTo Studios, Warsaw), "Sacrifice" is a turning point in Bar-On's aesthetics and an example of sophisticated work using voice, body and image of the body. Voice is a leading creative element of not only expressing, but first of all transforming emotions (like pain) in the work of art.

A documentary film was made from the performance in Quimper, France, witnessing Adina's visit at the Festival Mettre en Scene: Quimper.

Subtle level of communication is crucial for Bar-On's performances, working with "quantum level" of emotions. Laszlo Beke (director of Research Institute of Art History, Hungarian Academy of Science) wrote on "Sacrifice": "At the beginning after an intensive internal meditation she faced the audience (or one of its members) and waited, doing nothing, until this nothing ("tense nothing") became nearly unendurable. This is a kind of address that prepares the audience mentally and spiritually for the reception of forthcoming events".

"I'm engaged in tikkun, not from above, but in a language that everybody understands. Empathy to yourself. If you don't love and it's difficult for you now, at least have empathy."- wrote Bar-On in her autobiographical essay "A Soliloquy". "Sacrificed was performed for ten years in places including the Kuhsthalle, Budapest, Catalyst Arts Gallery: Belfast, Para/Site Art Space: Hong-Kong, Chasama Arts Space: New York.

=== "Rest", 1999–2005 ===
As Bar-On described it later: "Rest is a paraphrase of a popular and old Israeli lullaby that has become mythological – "Rest For The Weary". In the Shopping Mall, Opera House Tel Aviv Performing Arts Center and Central Bus Station suspended in a vertical elevated bed, way above the heads of passers by, I move as if in a state of sleep. As in a dream, out of the subconscious, I create images by my movement and my own vocal adaptation of the old Jewish Pioneer's song.

Placing myself in these locations I had become a provocation but more than that an image of a plea or a cry for time-out, for rest, detached from ideological idioms".

=== "About Love", 2004 ===
In About Love (close to previous "Vision") the performer was the creator of the image, and at the same time emanating certain "aura", direct communication with the audience, often felt as intervention in an intimate level of viewer's psyche, although he/she was a stranger or a passer-by. This performance was described by Bar-On's biographer, Idit Porat, as "transforming suffering into beauty".

In discussing this phase of her performance history, Adina has said: "II want to put questions of emotion on the pyre. I think this is an acute issue. I think it is what is lacking, not alienated discussions." The form of Bar-On's performances always explored delicacy, subtlety of meaning, allusions, conxeptualism, intellectual poetry, intellectual and spiritual signals going beyond symbolic levels of interpretation. In 2005, after a work "Dreamy", As Bar-On described it: "Emotions can be a material, it is my material. What do people usually do with emotions?"

=== "40x40/Sentenced to Life" ===
(lacking description)

=== "Disposition", Performance Series 2001-2010 ===
This site-specific performance is structured to be a journey or a walk through urban space, where Bar-On, dressed in red, is a guide or a leader. Playing with this motif of a woman leadership and multiple meanings of space when observed through artist's eyes, mostly the borders, no-mans land's, areas of former conflicts or places of "hidden history" to be revealed.

"Dispositions" were performed in Nachshon, Israel; Hong-Kong; Quimper, France; Helsinki, Finland; Toronto, Canada; Belfast, Northern Ireland, Oswiecim (city of Auschwitz) and Lublin, Poland.

=== "Sacred", 2011-2012 and "NO MATTER", 2013 ===
After Daniel Davis's death in 2010, the artist sharpened her massage and became more direct in performance art communication process. Making performances for no more than 30 people, she focused on building strong mental contact with each spectator/witness through all channels of human expression, but now transgressing symbolism and conceptual methods. This almost "mystical strategy", apophatic method is now extending existentialist implications of Bar-On's art and use of pre-expressive level in performance.

== New ways of creating engaged art ==
To create new performances in the mid-2010s, Bar-On merged everyday life situation with social symbolism, religious iconography, dream visions and mass media images. From this time Israeli and Palestinian dialogue is often a subject of the artist's work, as well as is Bar-On's own private life themes which are transported into performance art; ex. widows of the war on both sides of the conflict - Adina Bar-On's husband, Daniel Davis, died of brain tumour caused by military service in the Israeli Army. For five years he was able to express himself only by saying "Lo!" ("No!" in Hebrew).

Starting from early performances shown at the time of Yom Kippur War in 1973, through 1989 when Bar-On conducted a workshop at "The Peace Frontier. International Symposium for Sculpture and Painting", the performer is active in transporting her main subject of art - "conflict of identity and conflicting identities" - into constant existential practice.

Engaged in politics of the body, social role and gender from the very beginnings of her career in the 1970s, give Adina Bar-On a significant (although unconventional) role in feminist art.

== Relationships and art ==
Bar-On is a close friend of major performance artists and thinkers: Jan Swidzinski, Zbigniew Warpechowski, Boris Nieslony, Marlyn Arsem, with whom she is often meeting on art festivals and developed an informal group of performance artists who create contextual art in uncompromising way, with no support of the "art world" establishment, yet recognized and respected by its representatives. Her intent on working on a most fundamental level of human communication changed Bar-On's relationships with other artists and non-artists into live-art itself.

== Festivals ==
As a performer Bar-On presented her work on the most important performance art festivals in the world, including Blurr, Biennale of Performance Art: Jaffa/Tel-Aviv (many times under curatorship of Sergio Edelstein), Israel, In the Context of Art/ Differences: Warsaw, Interaction Festival: Piotrków Trybunalski, Asiatopia International Performance Festival; Bangkok, Social Art Forum: Paris, Epipederme / Performance Art event, Lisbon, Portugal, Tupada Action and Media Art, 2009/The 6th Tupada International Visual Performance Festival; Manila, Philippines, Asiatopia, International Performance Art Festival; Bangkok, Chiangmai, Thailand, Navinki 2001, Performance-Art Festival: Minsk, Belarus, International Performance Art Festival, "Castle of Imagination": Ustka-Slupsk, Poland, Festival Mettre en Scene: Quimper, France, The 5th Asian Performance Art Series + Shinshu Summer Seminar 2000: Macau, Hong-Kong, and Negoya, Tokyo, Nagano in Japan, and many others.

== Later work and educational projects ==
Early in her career Adina Bar-On started to teach and worked on various art educational projects focused on the language of visual communication and live-art. She has been giving numerous workshops in Israel (including Tel Aviv University, Kalisher Art School, Camera Obscura School of Art, School of Visual Theater Jerusalem, el-Hai College, Omanut La'am Art Education Organization, Holon School For The Education of Technology, Dar al- Kalima College of Art, The Academy od Dance and Music Jerusalem, Tel Aviv Museum of Art, Yasmin Goder Dance Group) as well as around the world as visiting professor: at the Wroclaw Art Academy, Oswiecim Jewish Center (at the Oświęcim Synagogue, Mobius Artists Group, Performance Art Conference: Essen, Braunschweig University/ Department of Fine Arts, Germany, and workshop leader: Arsenal Gallery in Bialystok, Wei Wei Dance Company, Hong Kong).

One of recent major projects, such as "Aesthetics and Bias" involve institutions such as Bezalel Academy, Eugeniusz Geppert Academy of Fine Arts in Wrocław, University of Fine Arts in Poznań, Warsaw Academy, Kraków Academy of Fine Arts, to work together in a process of developing new aesthetics.

== Adina Bar-On on film ==
Starting with the performance based film "A Woman of the Pots", Bar-On prepared a number of films and video installation which are important for understanding her approach to the art: "Portrait" (1999), "View" (2001) (as an aftermath of a performance under the same name), "Room" and "Motherland" (both in 2001). A relationship between live-art and film/video image was already explored in "Breath" (1994) and possibly this performance leaves a trace of what the artist thinks about film representation of live-art.

Bar-On played an important role in Amos Gitai 1990 film "Birth of a Golem" (Naissance d'un golem: Carnet de notes), giving an expressive improvised performance in the movie, and appearing on a screen in the moment when the story of a Golem is told. She also helped to direct Annie Lennox in her role as Golem's figure in the cave scene.

Adina Bar-On's full documentation of work on film is now hosted by The Art of Action Archives, an organization focused on anthropological research and preservation of performance art masterpieces.

== Students' work ==
During her years of teaching visual communication, Bar-On worked with young artists exploring future aesthetics. Bar-On’s aesthetics, not yet formally defined, have influenced a new generation of artists.

== Prizes and awards ==
- The American Israel Cultural Foundation America Israel Cultural Foundation - "A Prize of appreciation on a unique contribution in Art" - 2001.
- Prize of The Ministry of Culture and Education of Israel - 1991.

== Bibliography ==
=== Works on Bar-On ===
- "Adina Bar-on, Performance Artist, עדינה בר-און, אמנית מופע", by: Idit Porat,

Publishers: Hakibbutz Hameuchad Publishing House Ltd, Herzliya Museum of Art 2001. ISBN 965-02-0152-1.

=== Articles and studies ===
- Yona Fischer, "Performances of Adina Bar-On", Mussag, 1976.
- Sara Breitberg, "Adina Bar-On Facing the Audience: An Encounter", Yediot Aharonot, 5 March 1976.
- Martin Zet,"Lady in Red", 30 December 2002, FIX02 Belfast.

== See also ==
- Performance art
- Avant-garde
- Intermedia
- Feminist art
- List of Israeli visual artists
