= Na Laga'at =

Theatre company in Israel

- נא לגעת
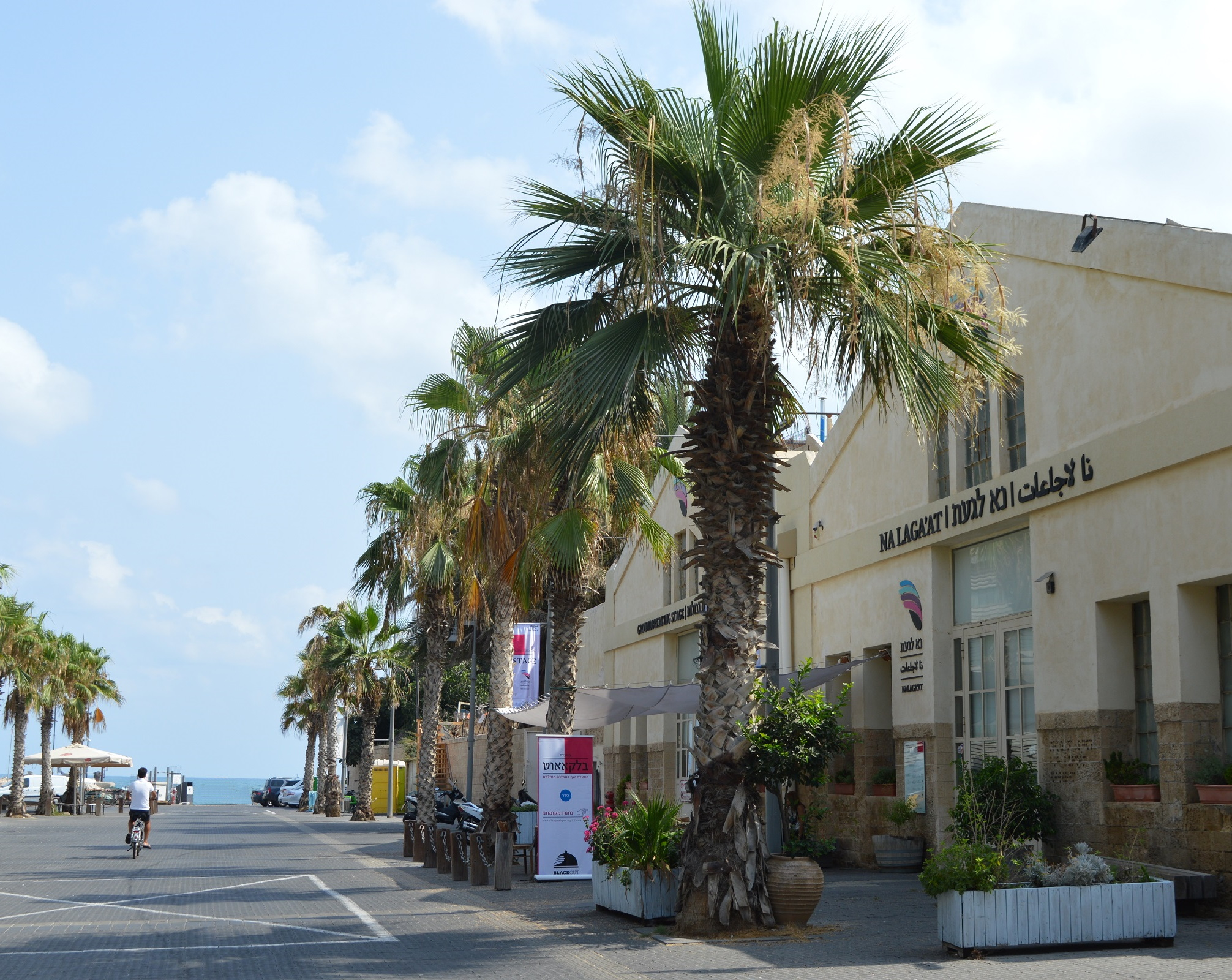
- The Na Laga'at Center in the Jaffa Port
- Formation: 2002; 24 years ago
- Founder: Adina Tal, Eran Gur
- Founded at: Israel
- Headquarters: Tel Aviv, Israel
- CEO: Oren Itzhaki

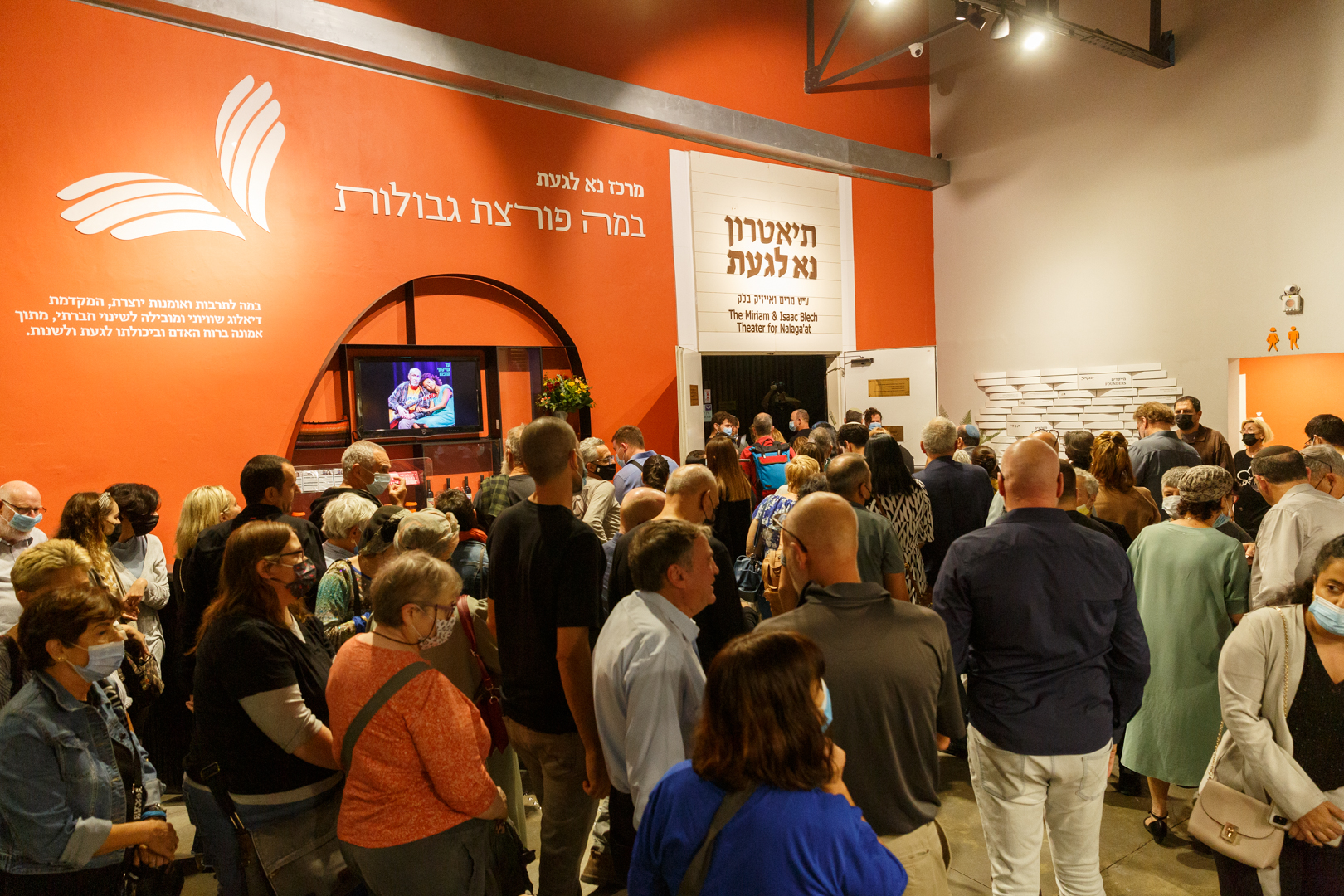
Entrance to the Na Laga'at Theater Hall. Credit: Benny Gam Zo Letova

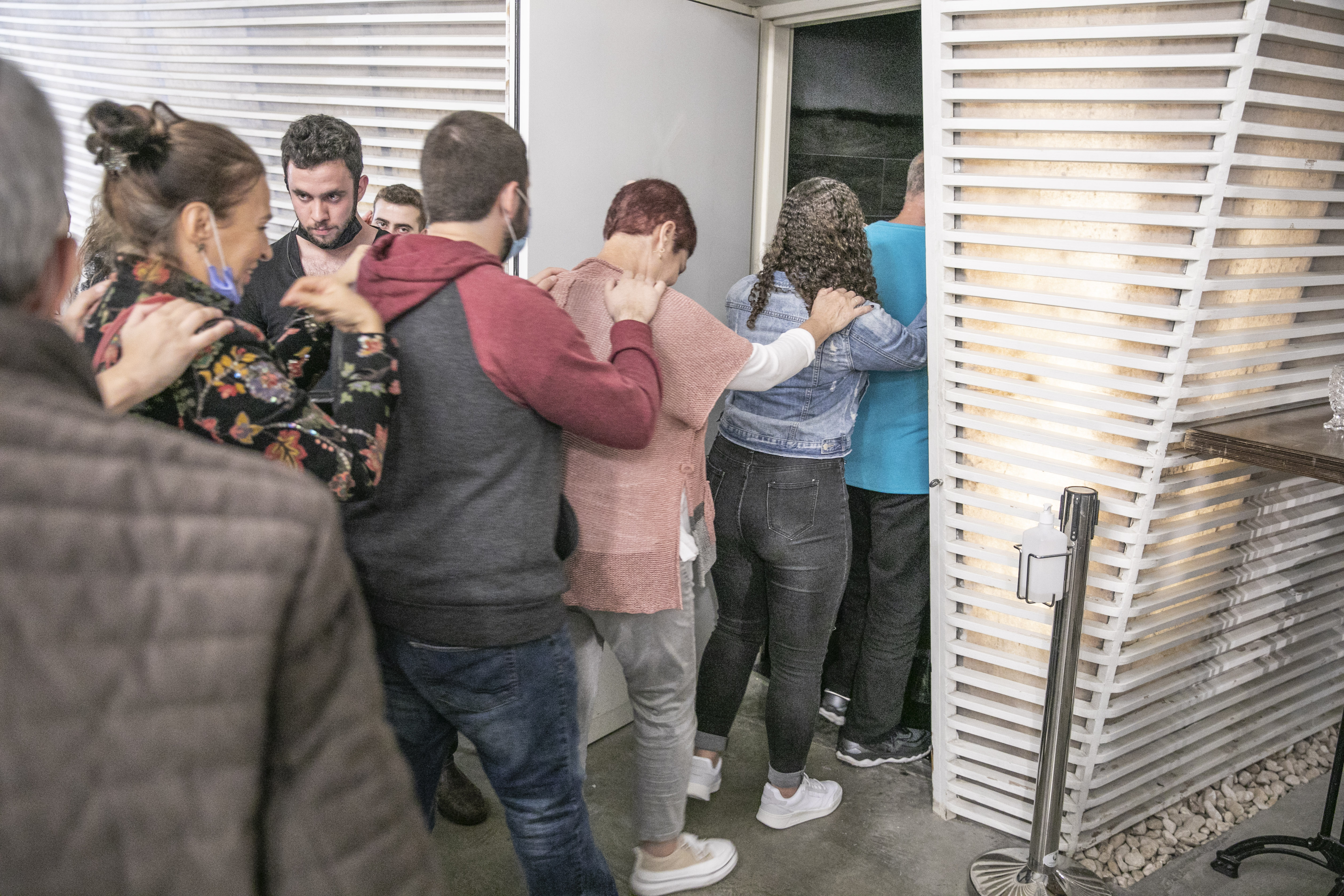
People entering the 'BlackOut' dark restaurant. Credit: Tomer Appelbaum

Na Laga'at (Hebrew for "Please Touch") is a nonprofit organization founded in 2002 by Adina Tal and Eran Gur. It is first ensemble of its kind in the world whose actors are all deafblind (double disability). The organization established a unique cultural center at the Levantbondet House in the Port of Jaffa in Tel Aviv. The center is a platform for creative arts, which promotes equal and open dialogue and leads to social change built on the belief in the human spirit and its ability to reach out and make a change.

== Na Laga'at Center ==
Established by the Na Laga'at organization the center opened its gates to the general public in December 2007. It employs more than a hundred people, most of whom are deaf, blind and deafblind.

The center operates the Na Laga'at theater with ensemble consists of deaf, blind, deafblind and actors who can see and hear; Kapish Events Complex, where waiters are deaf and communicate with the customers in sign language; The dark restaurant Blackout (kosher-dairy), where the meal is held in complete darkness and a team of blind and visually impaired waiters accompanies the patrons throughout the meal; workshops center, offering a variety of workshops led by content experts and a team of deaf, blind and deafblind instructors. The Na Laga'at center enables and advances equal and open dialogue to promote the needs and aspirations of every person in the belief that all human beings are equal.

Over the years the center's unique activities have earned it a number of prestigious awards and degrees in the fields of society and culture, and it was also among the organizations that violinist Yitzhak Perlman included in the awarding of the Genesis Prize. Pearlman explained the choice of Na Laga'at: "One of the most innovative theaters in the world, a cultural and arts center that brings together the deaf, the blind and the general public, and creates an equal dialogue that promotes the needs and aspirations of every person." In 2018 the center received an international social honorary award for "effectiveness of cultural action for a better society" on behalf of Fair Saturday foundation. This is the first win for an Israeli organization.

Oren Itzhaki is the CEO of the center since 2017.

== Na Laga'at Theater ==
Adina Tal and with Eran Gur founded the Nalaga'at Theater Company in 2002 after accepting an invitation to teach drama to a group of deaf-blind individuals. This experience grew into Nalaga'at (meaning "Please Touch" in Hebrew), the only professional deaf-blind theater company in the world. The Na Laga'at theater provides a permanent ongoing stage for the only ensemble in the world whose actors are deaf, blind, and deafblind, and to allow them artistic self-expression.

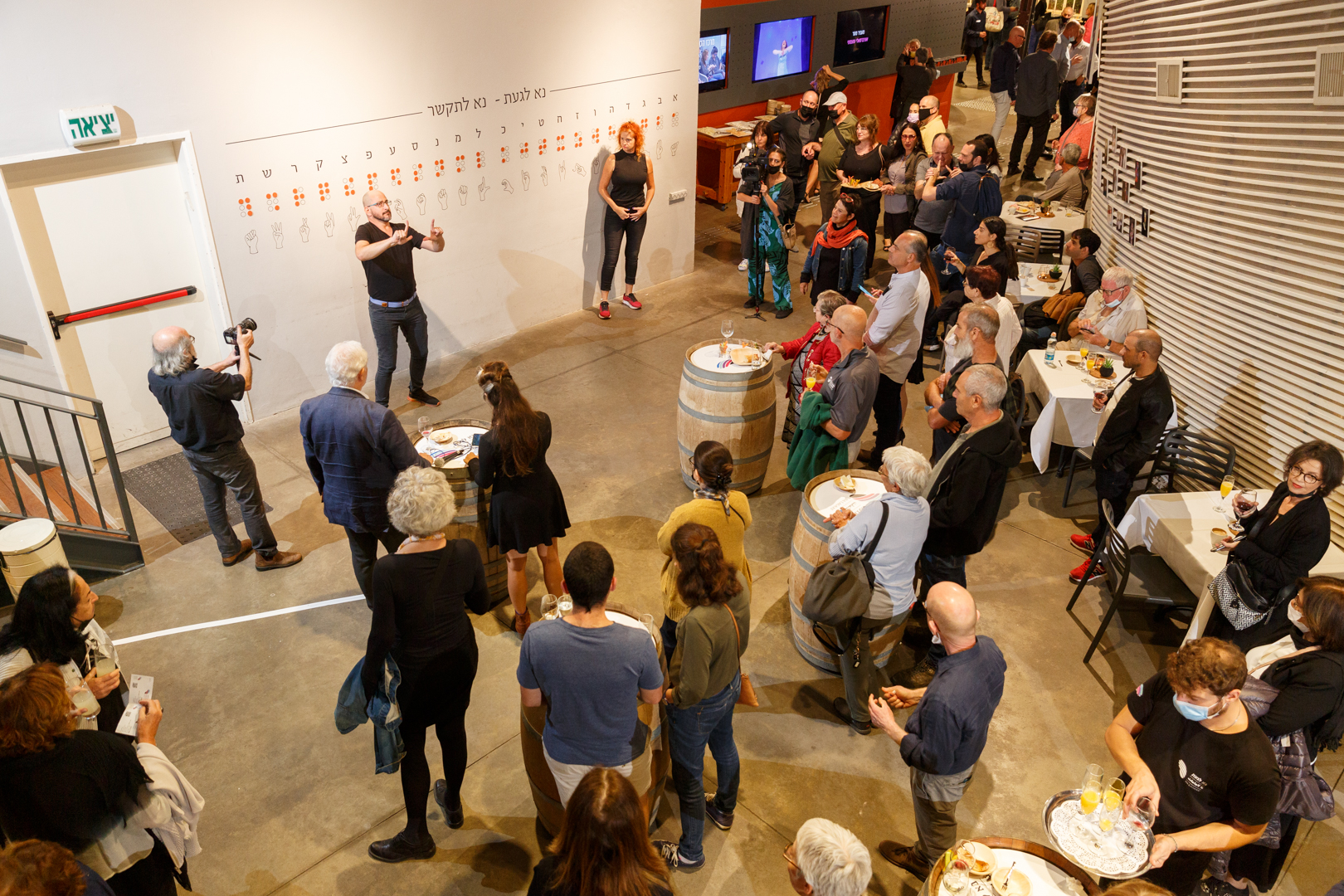
'Kapish" Events Hall. Credit: Benny Gam Zo Letova

Since it started to operate the theater has provided the audience with an artistic and social experience that changes perceptions and connects communities and sectors.

The theater offers a diverse repertoire of performances, allowing viewers a glimpse into the world of deaf, blind and deafblind people. It also raises questions of identity, inclusion, communication and acceptance of the other.

The theater's debuted performance "Light is Heard in Zig-Zag" directed by Adina Tal, was staged in 2000 in Israel and worldwide and received excellent reviews among viewers and critics.

The 2007 debut performance of "Light is Heard in Zig-Zag" was internationally successful, and led to the opening of the Nalaga'at Center in Tel Aviv. The theater's second performance, "Not by Bread Alone", directed by Adina Tal and featuring an ensemble of 11 deafblind actors and actresses, was first staged in 2007. Tactile Signing interpreters accompany the actors during rehearsals and performances. "Not by Bread Alone" toured the world.

Most deafblind people have the ability to communicate only with a person who knows Tactile Signing or "glove language", according to which each joint in the palm corresponds to a Hebrew letter written on the palm. Most of the actors in the show suffer from Usher Syndrome, a rare genetic disease that affects both hearing and vision. It causes deafness or hearing loss and an eye disease called Retinitis Pigmentosa (RP). The disease develops in adolescence or later, and causes significant vision difficulties and even blindness. Employing these actors in the theater on a daily basis empowers them, improves their interpersonal communication skills, reduces their social isolation and enables encounters and contact with hearing and seeing audiences and also with people of identical and different struggles.

There are many, varied ways of communication between team members in Na Laga'at that have been learned over the years. Each person in the group has their own needs and abilities, and so communication changes. "Not by Bread Alone" has been performed at the Na Laga'at center since its opening day and has been highly praised. The play has performed at leading festivals in Perth, New York, Boston, Washington, DC, the LIFT Festival in London and the International Music and Theater Festival in Uijeongbu (South Korea).

In 2009 the center ran a special program to train deaf and blind waiters in acting, during which a workshop of theatrical sign language for children called "Ten Siman" (in English, Give a Sign) took place, and in 2010 the children's play "Rooster Prince" directed by Adina Tal. Sign language workshops and activities in the dark were also developed for the general public.

In 2015 two new plays performed on stage with the participation of deafblind actors: the solo performance "Say Orange" directed by Sarah Siboni, which opened the 2015 Theatronetto Festival and performed at the Brave Festival in Poland in July 2016, and "Through the Wind" directed by Moshe Malka and featuring a new ensemble composed of deafblind actors and actresses, seeing and hearing actors and interpreters.

In 2017 a new play called "Edgar" was played on stage, introducing a deafblind actor, a blind actor, a deaf actress and seeing and hearing actresses, directed by Ofer Amram.

In 2018 the theater staged its own adaptation of the Tony Award-winning play Children of a Lesser God by Mark Madoff and directed by Noam Shmuel. Deaf actors participated in the production alongside hearing actors.

In 2019 the entertainment show "Deaf Conversation" took the stage, a one-of-a-kind show in Israel, directed by a hearing director and a deaf woman director and performed by six deaf actors and actresses. The show presents personal experiences of the actors and stigmas of deaf people on hearing people and vice versa in an experiential and funny way.

In 2020 the center had to close due to COVID-19.

In 2021 the center gradually opened its doors to the general public. At the Groundbreaking Art Festival, held in November each year, the play "Until the Apple is Picked" officially premiered. The play is by Yosefa Ibn Shushan and Emanuel Pinto, inspired by 'The Blind Beggar' parable from "The Seven Beggars" by Rabbi Nachman of Breslav and is featuring two deaf actors and a blind actor alongside seeing and hearing actors.

Nalaga'at has performed for hundreds of thousands of guests in Israel and worldwide.

== Blackout restaurant ==
In its new home the repertoire company went on to open the Blackout restaurant (where patrons sit in the dark and are served by blind waiters), and the Kapish coffee shop (which employs an all-deaf team of food servers).

The Blackout restaurant is the only dark restaurant in Israel. The kosher restaurant, located within the Na Laga'at complex, provides the guests with a very unusual culinary and sensory experience, as it offers meals in complete darkness. At the entrance to the dark area of the restaurant, guests are deprived of the sense of sight, intended to immediately evoke the feeling of the other senses being sharpened and strengthened. The team of blind or visually impaired waiters leads guests to their places and serves them a selection of distinctive dishes from a diverse menu.

== Kapish events complex ==
The Kapish complex hosts a wide variety of conferences and events. The complex is housed in a preserved and renovated mandatory historic building on the waterfront of Jaffa, designed as an open loft and combining the Jaffa authenticity and innovative urban design. The waiters and service providers at the Kapish events complex are deaf and hard of hearing people, and thus, the audience hosted in the complex is exposed to the Israeli Sign Language (ISL) and through it, communicates with the staff.

== Workshop Center ==
The workshop center at Na Laga'at offers a range of workshops. The workshops take place in the dark and in the light, and allow the general public to experiment the challenges associated with the world of the senses in an active, experiential way. All workshops are led by deaf, blind and deafblind moderators.

Dark Workshops: Wine and Cheese Tasting | Beer Tasting | Chocolate Tasting | Music and Sounds Workshop | Sculpture Workshop | Stand-Up Show

Light Workshops: Games with the Senses | Sign Language Workshop | Happily Ever Usher | Meeting with an actor | Executive Workshop

Dark workshops are held at the Na Laga'at complex. The light workshops can be booked for activities all over the country. The content is tailored to the needs of the group and the age range.

== The educational program ==
The Na Laga'at center aims to expand the circles of exposure among children, adolescents and adults, thus developing and strengthening the important dialogue between different communities and bridging cultural-social gaps while accepting the other and recognizing their strengths and not their weaknesses. The center's performances and workshops also reach out - to the general population and to schools and educational institutions in particular, in the form of enrichment programs for kindergarten children, school students and educational staff and, in accordance with the participants' age and their world of content.

== Music performances and concerts in the dark ==
The Na Laga'at center offers a different listening experience, in the dark - music performances by the best composers in Israel (Arkady Duchin, Matti Caspi, Yoni Rechter, Berry Sakharof, Keren Peles, Shalom Hanoch, etc.) along with classical music concerts performed, for the first time in Israel, without musical notes and without any eye contact with the audience (Israel Chamber Orchestra and South American Folklore Ensemble 'Mass Creole'). The performances in the dark draw great interest of the audience in Israel and worldwide, as the sounds arouse a new world of perception and emotion.

== Adina Tal ==
Adina Tal
- עדינה טל
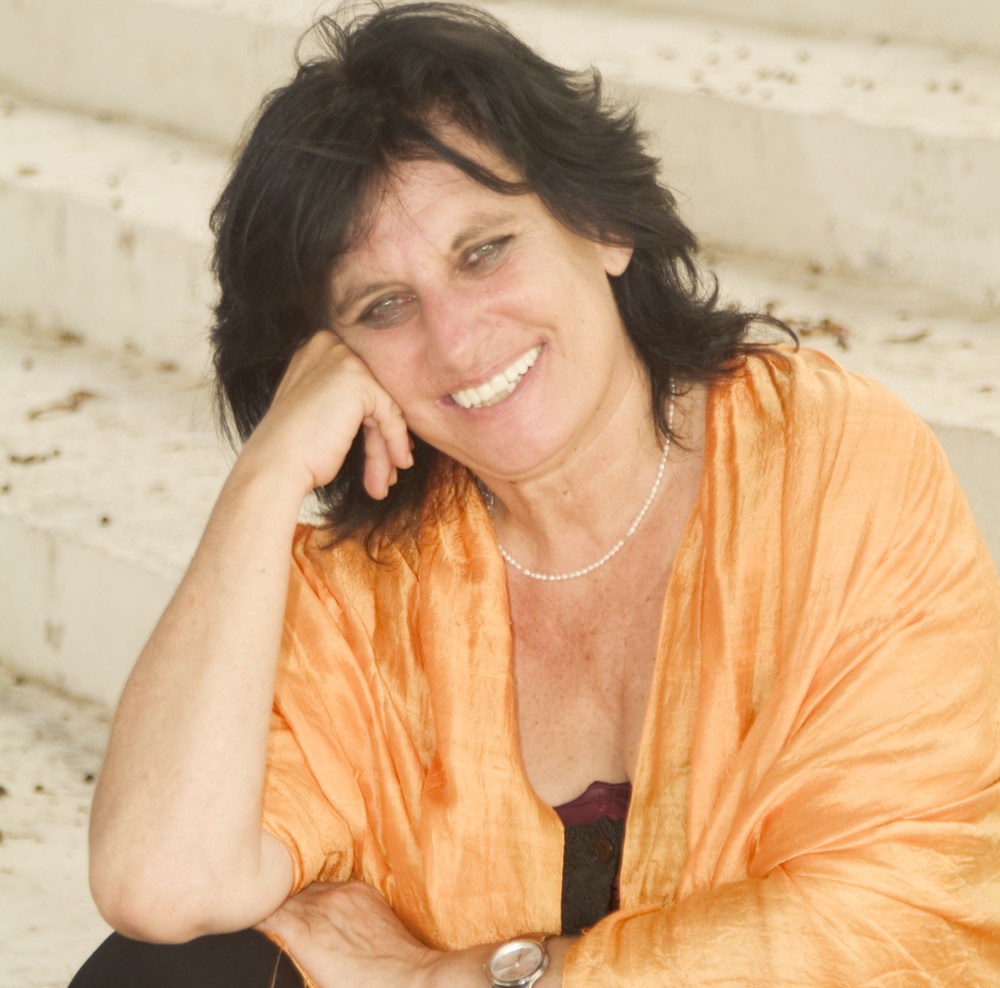
- Adina Tal
- Born: Zürich, Switzerland
- Occupations: Motivational Speaker, Director, Actress
- Known for: Founder Nalaga'at Deaf-Blind Cultural Center
- Spouse: married
- Children: 3
- Website: AdinaTal.com

Adina Tal (Hebrew: עדינה טל) is an actress, playwright, theater director and cofounder of the Nalaga'at Theater Company. She was born and raised in Switzerland, and immigrated to Israel at the age of 20.

=== Erua Theater ===
Erua Theater was established in 1985 by Adina Tal and Rina Padua. An independent theater company specializing in interactive theater with a strong social engagement, Erua focused on dealing with serious issues in a humorous way. In almost 15 years at Erua, Adina Tal wrote and directed multiple theater plays, including plays about violence, old age and Jewish identity. She also wrote for radio and television programs."How are you?" - a play about a woman - went to become a hit, with over 2500 performances.

=== Lectures & Workshops ===
External videos
- TEDx Talk Adina Tal - What we learn from the deaf-blind theatre, YouTube video
- TEDx Talk Adina Tal - Nalaga'at Vision, YouTube Video

Adina Tal's lectures and workshops are inspired by her experiences with Nalaga'at. In her talks and workshops Adina shares the story behind the challenges, growth, and success of the theater company.

She lectures at conferences, social institutions and enterprises worldwide. Some of her talks are available online, for example some TEDx talks.

=== Awards and Distinctions ===
- Honorary Doctorate from Tel Aviv University
- Honorary Fellow at the Ruppin Academy
- Social Entrepreneur of the Year 2014 - The Schwab Foundation for Social Entrepreneurship
- Named one of the "50 Most Talented Social Innovators" at the World Corporate Social Responsibility (CSR) Day in Mumbai, India, 2015

== Repertoire ==
- Not by Bread Alone
- Say Orange
- Deaf Conversation
- It could be a man standing in snow
- Children of a Lesser God
- The Warden of Block 11

== See also ==
- Culture of Israel
- Deaf Culture
- Helen Keller
- Adina Tal (co-founder Nalaga'at with Eran Gur)
