= Edina Szvoren =

Hungarian writer (born 1974)

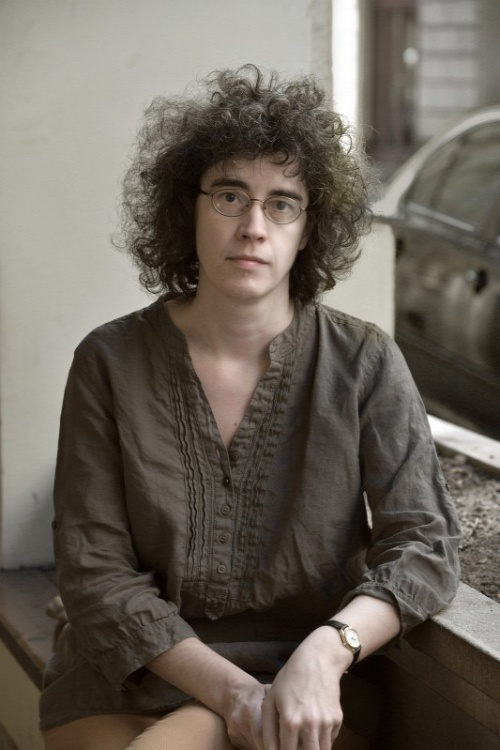
Edina Szvoren

Edina Szvoren (born 1974) is a Hungarian writer. She was born in Budapest and studied music at the Béla Bartók Music High School and the Franz Liszt Academy of Music.

== Books ==
- Pertu, 2010, Palatinus
- Nincs, és ne is legyen (There Is None, Nor Let There Be), 2012, Palatinus
- Az ország legjobb hóhéra (The Best Headsman in the Land), 2015, Magvető
- Verseim, 2018, Magvető

== Awards ==
- Móricz fellowship (2009)
- Déry Award (2010) for Pertu
- Sándor Bródy Award (2011) for Pertu
- NKA advocacy (2012)
- Artisjus Award (2013) for Nincs, és ne is legyen
- Attila József Prize (2014)
- EU Prize for Literature (2015) for Nincs, és ne is legyen
- Miklós Mészöly Prize (2019) for Verseim
- Libri Prize (2019) for Verseim
