= Magatte Wade =

Senegalese businesswoman (born 1976)

- Magatte Wade in 2023
- Born: 1976 (age 49–50); Dakar, Senegal
- Other name: Magatte Wade-Marchand
- Occupation: businesswoman

Magatte Wade (born 1976) is a Senegalese businesswoman. As an entrepreneur she has built brands in consumer goods with West African recipes and advocates for better entrepreneurial conditions in Africa. Her companies and brands include Adina World Beat Beverages, Tiossan, and SkinIsSkin.

== Biography ==
Wade was born in Senegal, educated in France, and later shifted her entrepreneurial focus to the United States. fter returning to Senegal, she used the displacement of the traditional hibiscus drink Bissap by Western brands as the starting point for a business idea. Adina World Beat Beverages was founded in San Francisco in 2004 and developed beverages based on traditional recipes, which were sold in the United States through Whole Foods Market and Wegmans. After receiving initial funding from the founding team venture capital was later raised for Adina. Following Adina, she turned to cosmetics with Tiossan; the brand was based on Senegalese skincare recipes and was distributed through Nordstrom and select boutiques. With SkinIsSkin, she pursued another consumer goods project, in which lip care products based on Senegalese ingredients were manufactured in Senegal and marketed in the USA.

Magatte Wade in 2013

Wade believes that prosperity in Africa will primarily result from manufacturing, entrepreneurship, and fewer bureaucratic obstacles. Her TED Talk, "Why it's too hard to start a business in Africa — and how to change it," was released in 2018 and brought this view to an international audience. In 2011, Forbes included her in its list of The 20 Youngest Power Women in Africa. She was also a Young Global Leader of the World Economic Forum and a TED Global Africa Fellow. In 2015, she was appointed to the board of the Global Wellness Summit, where she helped develop a new Africa initiative. In 2019, she became the director of the Atlas Network's Center for African Prosperity, which aimed to promote strategies for economic freedom and entrepreneurship in Africa. In the discussion about newly founded cities or special zones with their own economic and administrative legal order, she expressed her support for the basic idea, but demanded that foreign rules be limited to economic law and that criminal and family law should originate from the host country. In 2025, she co-founded Próspera Africa, a project that aimed to promote autonomous urban development in African states with greater legal certainty for investments and less bureaucracy.
