= Dans le Noir? =

Restaurant chain

Coordinates: 48.8609°N 2.3505°E

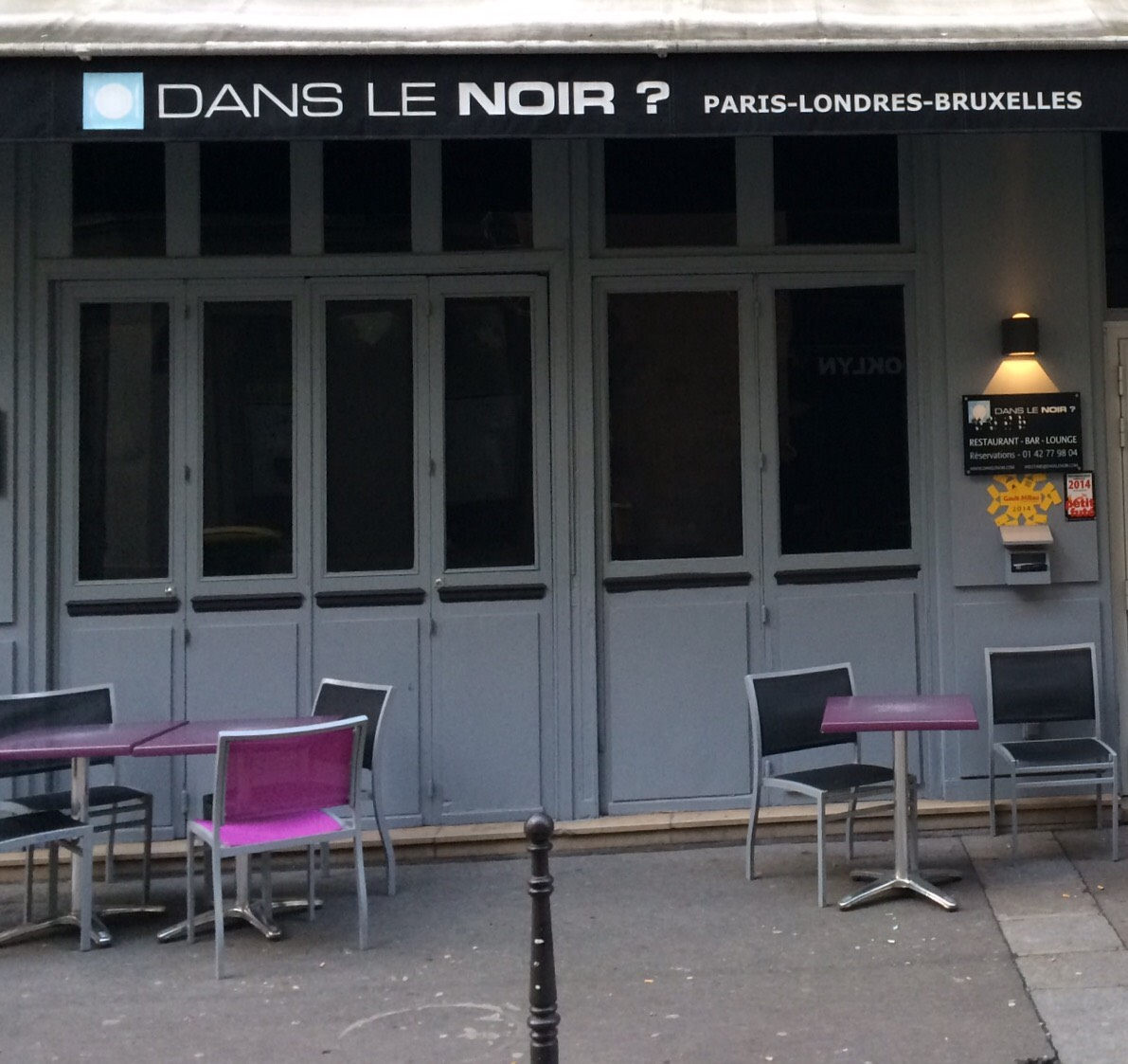
The blacked-out windows of the Paris restaurant

Dans Le Noir? (French for "in the dark") is a chain of restaurants where guests are served in total darkness, a concept called dark dining or blind dining. "Dans le Noir?" also diversified its activities into shops and spas.

Dans Le Noir was founded in 2004 in Paris by Edouard de Broglie, a French entrepreneur. Subsequent locations were opened in London, Barcelona, New York, St. Petersburg, Auckland, Melbourne, and Nairobi. The London location is featured in a key scene in the 2013 movie About Time. The New York location officially closed in 2013 due to financial constraints resulting from insufficient visitor numbers, despite having served over 10,000 patrons during its 15 months of operation.

"Dans Le Noir?" claims that through limiting the sense of sight, other senses are intensified, including relations between people. Diners at "Dans Le Noir?" have little knowledge of the entrées, appetizers, desserts, and wine choice of their meal, which is primarily inspired by French cuisine. Diners are served by either blind or visually impaired waitstaff. A percentage of the profits support charities in different countries.

== See also ==
- Black Restaurant
