= Adina World Beat Beverages =

American beverage manufacturer

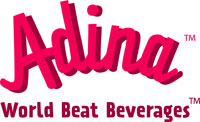
- Company type: Private
- Founded: San Francisco, California, United States of America, 2004
- Founder: Magatte Wade; Greg Steltenpohl; Dominique Leveuf
- Headquarters: San Francisco, California, United States of America
- Area served: Western United States
- Products: Beverages
- Revenue: US$3.2 million
- Number of employees: 25
- Website: http://www.bevnet.com/reviews/adina

Adina World Beat Beverages was a manufacturer of coffee, tea and juice drinks based in San Francisco, California. The company was founded in 2004 by Magatte Wade, Greg Steltenpohl (one of the co-founders of Odwalla Inc.) and Dominique Leveuf. Adina was led by "an international team of entrepreneurs from Odwalla, SoBe and Peet's Coffee" and claimed to preserve traditional beverage recipes from around the world from "being replaced by cola drinks distributed by multinational corporations".

Adina manufactured its drinks from "sustainable" ingredients obtained through fair trade and sourced from small-scale farmers in places like India, Guatemala, Indonesia, and Ethiopia. The company says it works to aid to impoverished farmers.

The company went out of business in 2012.

== Origin ==
Magatte Wade came up with the idea to start a beverage company when she visited her native Senegal and found that cola had replaced traditional hibiscus drinks. Worried that the drinks and the heritage would be lost, Wade approached Greg Steltenpohl, who had recently left as head of Odwalla Inc. and asked for help to begin a company. He agreed, and, with his wife, Dominique Leveuf, the three began the company. Adina for Life is headquartered at 660 York Street in San Francisco, California. To fund the start-up, the founders contributed heavily; in addition, the trio raised $5 million in investments in early years.

The company sold a variety of beverages based on drinks from around the world in 14 fluid ounce bottles, mainly to the San Francisco Bay Area. However, the company is promoting their products in large cities throughout the United States like New York City and Austin, Texas.

== Partnerships ==
Adina partnered with several organizations, including Agribusiness in Sustainable Natural African Plant Products (ASNAPP), which works to reduce poverty in Africa; Association Education Santé (AES), which works to help hibiscus farmers in the global market; the ECO-AGRI Research Foundation, a non-profit organization centered in India seeking to improve the lives of rural farmers; as well as other co-ops and financers in third-world countries.

== Products ==
The company had four product lines: Adina Organic Blends, an organic Fair Trade line of exotic gourmet coffees and tea launched in late 2007; Adina Miracle Fruits Fortified Juice Drinks, launched in 2006; Adina Organic Juice Coolers, launched in 2005; and its Natural Highs fair-trade certified all natural cold-brewed coffee energy drink in October 2008. The drinks were sold at Whole Foods Market and came in flavors such as mocha, hazelnut, and double espresso.
