= Dark dining =

Act of eating a meal without seeing the food that is being eaten

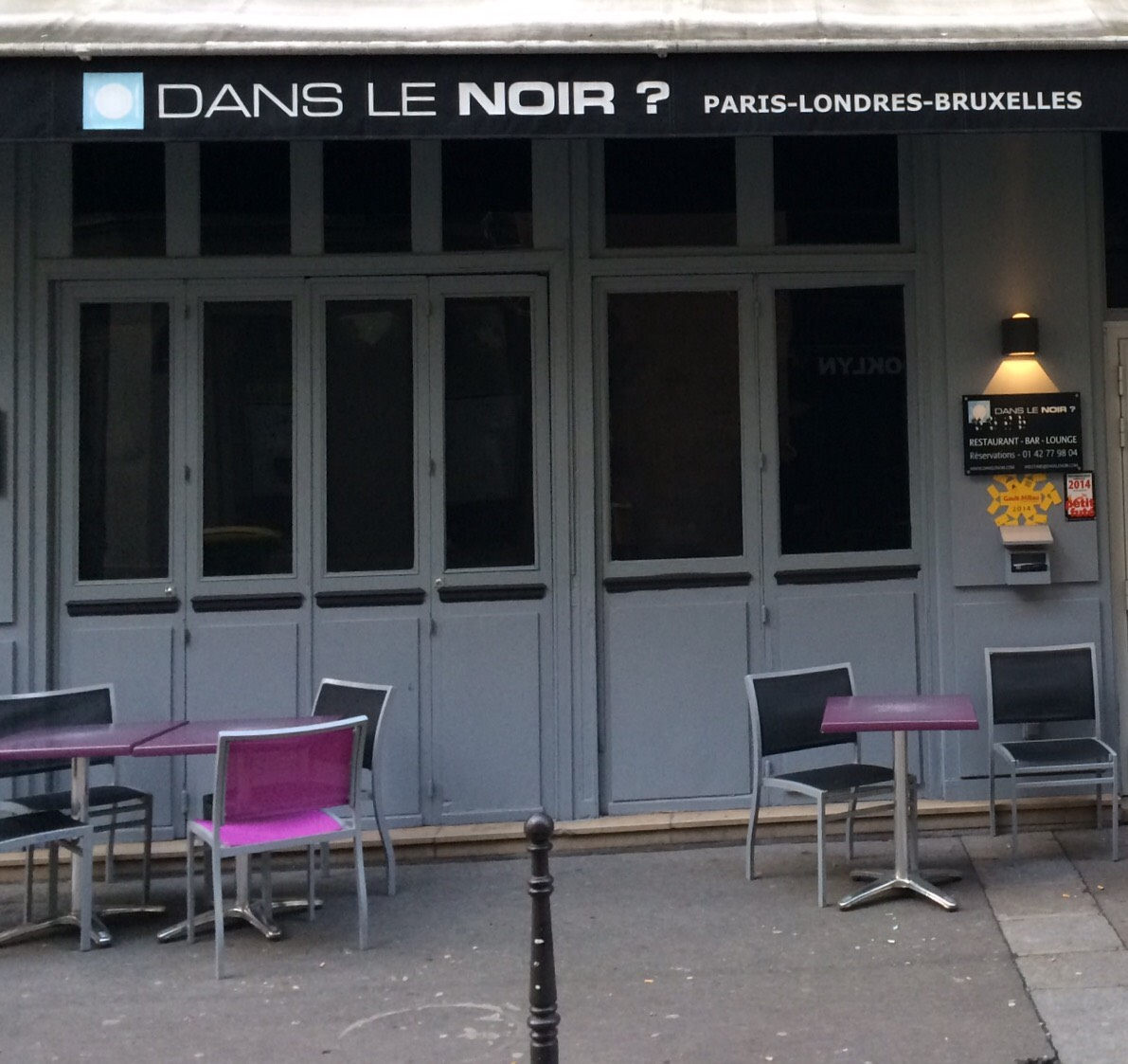
The blacked-out windows of Dans le Noir, a dark restaurant in Paris

Dark dining is the act of eating a meal without seeing the food that is being eaten. The basic concept is that the removal of vision enhances the other senses and increases gastronomic pleasure. Since 1999, specialised dark restaurants have opened in many parts of the world.

== Origin ==
The first experience of dark restaurant took place in Paris, set up by Michel Reilhac and was called "Le gout du noir". This program started in 1997 and was followed by the opening of a temporary restaurant in the "Montorgeuil" district in Paris during the summer 1999. This program became in 2003 "Dans le Noir ?" founded by Edouard de Broglie, a French entrepreneur in cooperation with the blind foundation Paul Guinot. It became the first international chain of restaurant in the dark. The first permanent restaurant was Blindekuh (Blind man's buff in German), in Zurich, Switzerland. It was opened in September 1999 by a blind clergyman, Jorge Spielmann, who wished to convey the experience of blindness to sighted customers. Spielmann says the idea came after guests who had dined blindfolded at his own home reported greater enjoyment of their meal through the senses of taste and smell.

== Growth ==
The opening of Blindekuh in 1999 was followed during the next few years by other dark restaurants in cities in Europe and North America and Asia. In 2008 there were around six and by 2014 there were claimed to be "dozens [of] restaurants around the world". The only international multi-restaurant chains is Dans le Noir ? in Europe, Russia and Pacific,. Opaque is the only chain operation in the US after Dans le Noir ? left New York.

== Operation ==
In most cases the restaurant area is kept in complete darkness, with all sources of light eliminated, including mobile phones and cameras. In other venues the customers are blindfolded instead. Before entering, customers choose their meal, often selecting from among several generic menus rather than specific items. Allen's (2012) review reported that for many customers, eating in the dark can be "an unsettling experience", in particular the physical process of feeding oneself; even though the menu may be adapted to allow for "the diner's limited ability to aim a knife and fork".

Many dark restaurants employ blind or visually impaired waiters and guides, whose condition enables them to work with little difficulty in darkened surroundings. Visually impaired staff may teach something of the techniques they themselves use in everyday life.

Dark dining may also be staged as an event, rather than having a permanent location. Some dark restaurants offer live music or storytelling to accompany the meal.

== Aims ==
=== Heightened sensory experience ===
The notion that a meal can be more enjoyable without sight is typically described as "the theory that flavors are intensified when people can't see what they're eating". A counter-argument has been put that "most of us eat with our eyes, enjoying a plate before we've tasted it. So the trade-off might not be even."

An analysis by Allen (2012) of customer reviews found that many did report "heightening of the nonvisual senses". Allen proposed a neurological basis for this phenomenon, involving "combination-selective neurons" which normally receive visual input in addition to that from other senses. Similar thinking has been the basis for the development of blindfolded tourism.

=== Awareness and support for visual impairment ===
Allen (2012) has described the aim of temporarily conveying the experience of blindness as having been subsidiary in practice to that of the distinctive gastronomic experience. However, some dark restaurants have included awareness-raising in their stated aims, including the Dans le Noir? chain.

Some dark restaurants devote part of their proceeds to charities or causes concerned with visual impairment. Among these are Dine in the Dark (DID) in Bangkok and O.Noir, Montreal. In Zurich, the original dark restaurant is part of the Blind-Leicht project, aimed at creating jobs for blind people.

== Comment ==
=== Novel experience ===
Commentary has stressed the novelty and distinctiveness of the dark dining concept, e.g. "... it definitely elevates the simple task of eating into an entirely new experience. This won't likely be the type of restaurant you'll visit over and over again, but the glimpse it offers of a world without sight is certain to leave a lasting impression."

Not only the eating itself, but also the conversation with one's neighbours, may be experienced as different. The diners' being unable to see one another has been seen as a positive feature, removing social inhibitions, particularly in dating situations and it has also been pointed out that "Using the wrong spoon isn't an issue".

=== Marketing ploy ===
In some accounts the concept "can trend toward marketing gimmick" or is an example of a "theme or attraction to get ... bodies into seats". Gerard (2008) concluded that "there is little altruistic" about the restaurant he reviewed, and asked "Are we really so bored that we find it diverting to eat in the dark?"

=== Food quality ===
Some accounts have suggested that food quality may be accorded lower priority than novelty of ambience and experience. Comment in general accounts has included "Not all locations are strictly about the food" and "...other factors – namely the food – are sacrificed for the sheer concept."

Two reviews of particular venues stated

- "The food itself ... would likely be unremarkable in an ordinary setting"
- "...indescribably awful food"

== List of dark dining events or restaurants ==
=== International ===
- Dans le Noir ?

=== Asia ===
- Dining in the Dark - Bukit Bintang, Kuala Lumpur, Malaysia
- NOX - Dine In The Dark, Singapore
- Noir. Dining in the dark. - Ho Chi Minh City, Vietnam
- BlackOut – Na La'gaat Center - Tel Aviv, Israel
- Black Restaurant
- Singapore Association of the Visually Handicapped
- DID – Phnom Penh, Cambodia

=== Europe ===
- Dark Restaurant — Poznań, Poland
- Blindekuh - Switzerland
- Unsicht Bar - Berlin, Germany
- Nocti Vagus - Berlin, Germany
- Svartklubben - Stockholm, Sweden
- Blind Bar
- Vier Sinne - Vienna, Austria
- Tenebris – Sofia, Bulgaria
- C Taste - Amsterdam, Netherlands

=== South America ===
- La casa de Rafa - Quito, Ecuador

=== North America ===
- Blackout (Las Vegas, Nevada, USA)
- Dark Table (Vancouver, British Columbia, Canada)
- O. Noir (Montreal, Quebec, Canada)
- ONoir (Toronto, Ontario, Canada)
- Opaque (Santa Monica, California, USA)
- Wyld Pines (Camas Washington, USA)

=== Australia ===
- Chefin Experience
- Dining in the Dark Experience (Sydney)
