= Adina Apartment Hotels =

Hospitality brand originating from Australia

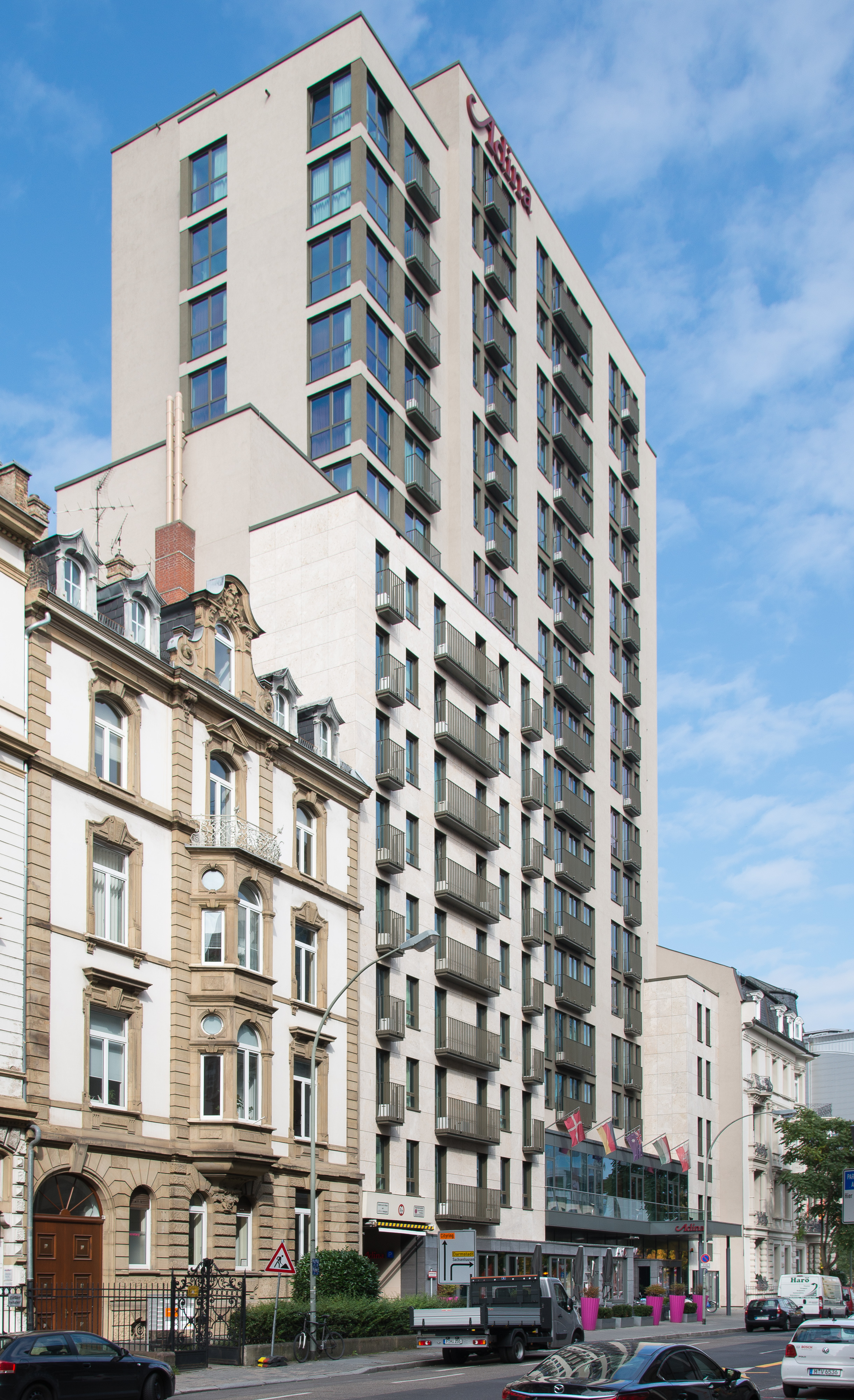
Adina Apartment Hotel in Frankfurt, Germany

Adina Apartment Hotels is a hospitality brand originating from Australia, and a subsidiary of TFE Hotels. The brand was established as part of the Toga Group's (now TFE Hotels) expansion into Europe, and was later applied to the company's hotels in Australia. As of 2018, 32 Adina Apartment Hotels are operational in Australia, Europe and New Zealand.

== History ==
In 1998 the Toga Group opened the first Adina Apartment Hotel in Budapest. This was an expansion of their Australian operations, which comprised the Medina and Vibe chains. Adina was the first Australian-owned apartment hotel chain in Europe. The decision to expand into Europe was driven by an assessment by Toga Group's owners that while there was little scope to open further apartment hotels in Australia, the market for this kind of accommodation in Europe was immature.

In November 2005, Toga was seeking to establish a $A134 million fund to open further Adina hotels in Europe, and partly fund an expansion in Australia. At this time, Toga Group was to manage the hotels and own 25% of the units of the fund. An Adina hotel was also scheduled to open in Copenhagen in December 2005. By February 2009 the chain comprised three hotels in Budapest, Copenhagen and Berlin. A further four hotels were under construction: two in Berlin, and one each in Hamburg and Frankfurt.

In March 2014 the Toga Group changed its name to Toga Far East Hotels after establishing a joint venture with the Singaporean company Far East Hospitality. At this time there were seven Adina Hotels in Europe, and The Australian reported that the joint venture may provide funding for further expansion. The 'Adina' name was being applied to all of the company's apartment hotels worldwide, with the 'Medina' brand being used for serviced apartments.

As of March 2018, there were 20 Adina apartment hotels in Australia, 11 in Europe and one in New Zealand. Further Adina Apartment Hotels are planned, including the first to open in the United Kingdom. In 2017, TFE Hotels was also planning to establish a brand of luxury hotels to be called "Adina Grand".
