= Adina Fohlin =

Swedish model and photographer (born 1984)

- Born: 20 December 1984 (age 40); Sweden
- Modelling information
- Height: 1.85 m (6 ft 1 in)
- Hair colour: Light brown
- Eye colour: Blue

Adina Fohlin (born 20 December 1984) is a Swedish model and photographer. She was discovered while walking down the street in Stockholm, and Susanna Rönn, at Mikas, a Swedish modelling agency. approached her, having noticed her unusual features. Myriam Obadiah, creative director of Fohlin's agency, Next, described her as a girl who does not resemble a typical model.

In 2003 Fohlin was awarded Model of the year by Swedish Elle.

Fohlin appeared on the cover of Japanese and Italian Vogue for the June 2007 issue, Flair, French Revue de Modes, Swedish ELLE and The Face magazine. First surfacing on international catwalks during the spring 2001 prêt-à-porter season, Fohlin has proved a prolific runway model, appearing in numerous shows for fashion houses such as Christian Dior, Chanel, Alexander McQueen, Gucci, YSL Rive Gauche and Prada among others.

In addition to her editorial and runway career, Fohlin has appeared in advertisements for David Yurman, YSL Rive Gauche, Alessandro Dell'Acqua, EXTÈ, Rocco Barocco, and Tommy Hilfiger among others.

Fohlin appeared in a commercial for Apoliva, an assortment of personal care products, for Apoteket that aired in Sweden around August 2009. The commercial gained notoriety in Sweden after almost 100,000 Swedes joined a Facebook group called “I am scared of the girl in the Apoliva commercial.”

Between the years of 1994-2002 Adina Fohlin attended The Royal Swedish Balett School in Stockholm where she studied the art of both classical and modern balett. During this time she was cast as one of the terns in A Midsummer Night's Dream.

Fohlin is a working freelance photographer, her portfolio consists of everything from fashion photography to art. She is also a model at Mikas.

She is currently collaborating with artist Natalia Edenmont. The work will be shown in New York City the fall of 2014. Other than her current collaborations she has also influenced artists like Robyn and Kleerup, functioning as the muse for the song With Every Heartbeat and Andrew Wyatt from the band Miike Snow. He wrote her the song There is a Spring as a tribute.
