= Adena (musician) =

Romanian singer-songwriter

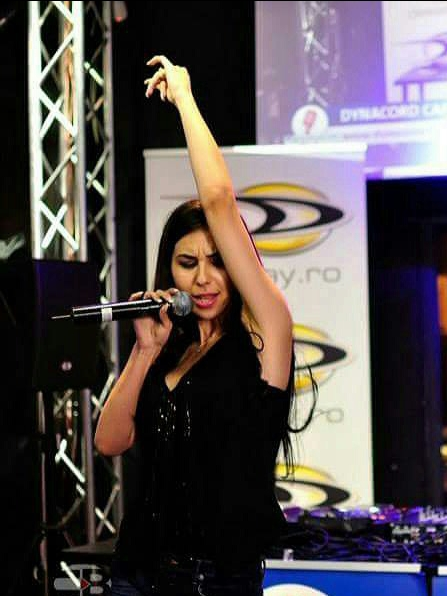

Background information
- Also known as: Adina Zotea
- Born: Adina-Flavia Zotea
- Origin: Bucharest, Romania
- Genres: Pop; Dance
- Occupation: Singer-songwriter
- Instrument: Vocals
- Years active: 2011–present
- Website: www.facebook.com/adenaofficial

Adina Flavia Zotea-Secui, better known by her stage name Adena, is a Romanian singer-songwriter. She debuted in 2011 with her single "S.O.S", produced by Connect-R.

== Biography ==
Adina Zotea appeared on a recording in 2011 at the age of 19, with the song "S.O.S". In the autumn of the same year, she started a collaboration with Laurenţiu Duţă for the singles "Milkshake" featuring Dony and then "Lay Me Down" in 2012, in collaboration with the Spanish DJ Luis Lopez. A video was made for "Lay Me Down" in Valencia and, thanks to this, the young artist became known in Spain and Latin America, the song being in the top of the charts, like Los 40 Principales. At the beginning of 2013, she released the song "Miracle of Love" produced by Mario Morreti. In the autumn of the same year, Adena started a new project alongside DJ Take. This is how "Party Machines" appeared, a rhythmical and cheerful song, dedicated to her clubbing and dance music fans. After a short pause, 2015 began with the song "Tu mano", alongside the DJ and producer Geo Raphael. In the same year, the single "Inocența" appeared, the first song performed in Romanian by Adena. The song is produced by Mario Morreti and Boier Bibescu.

== Discography ==
=== Singles ===
- "S.O.S" (2011)
- "Milkshake" (feat. Dony, 2011)
- "Lay Me Down" (feat. Luis López, 2011)
- "Miracle of love" (2013)
- "Party Machines" (feat. DJ Take, 2013)
- "Tu mano" (feat. Geo Raphael, 2015)
- "Inocența" (2015)
- "Feel" (feat. Geo Raphael, 2015)
- "Soulmates" (feat. Geo Raphael, 2016)
- "Calentura" (2016)
- "Ea" (feat. Geo Raphael, 2017)
- "Mon Amour" (feat. Geo Raphael, 2018)
