= List of restaurants in Switzerland =

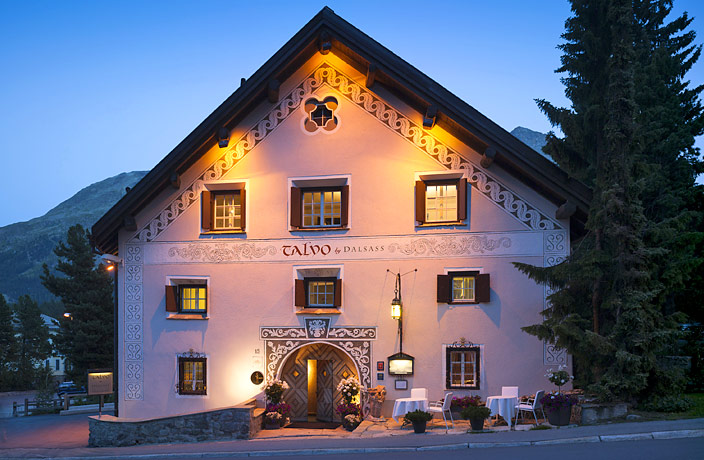
The main entrance of Restaurant Talvo, with its typical engadin Sgraffito-ornaments on its façade. The historic farm house was built in 1658

This is a list of notable restaurants in Switzerland, sorted by canton and municipality. It also includes notable inns, mountain inns, taverns, cafés and bars.

For Michelin Star rated restaurants, see list of Michelin-starred restaurants in Switzerland.

== Notable examples ==
=== Canton of Aargau ===
Wettingen

- Gasthof Sternen (oldest inn in Switzerland)

=== Canton of Appenzell Innerrhoden ===
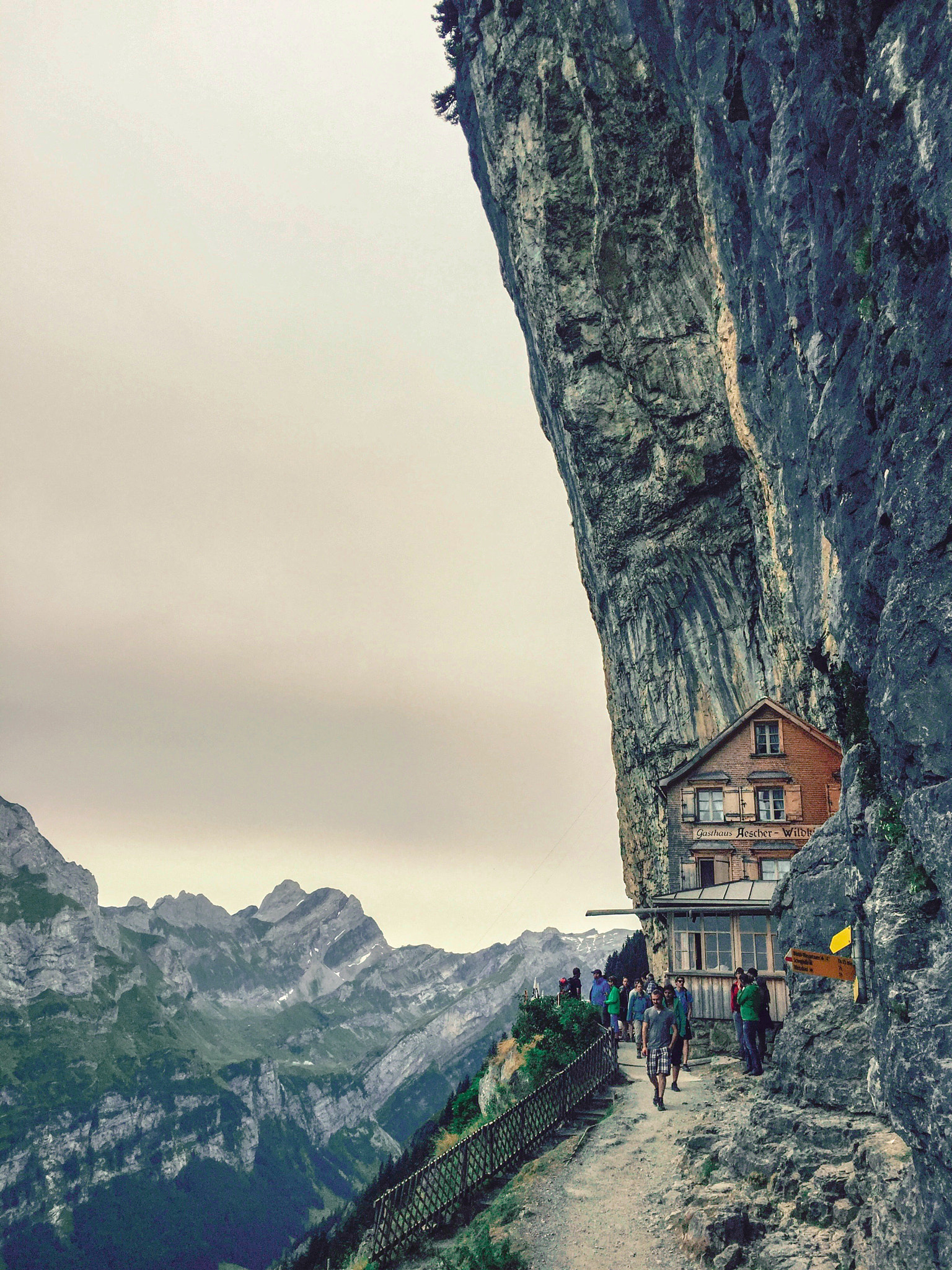
Äscher mountain inn

Schwende-Rüte

- Berggasthaus Äscher (built into a cave)
- Hoher Kasten (revolving restaurant)

=== Canton of Basel-Stadt ===
Basel

- Blindekuh (dark dining)
- Gasthof zum Goldenen Sternen (oldest inn in Basel)

=== Canton of Bern ===
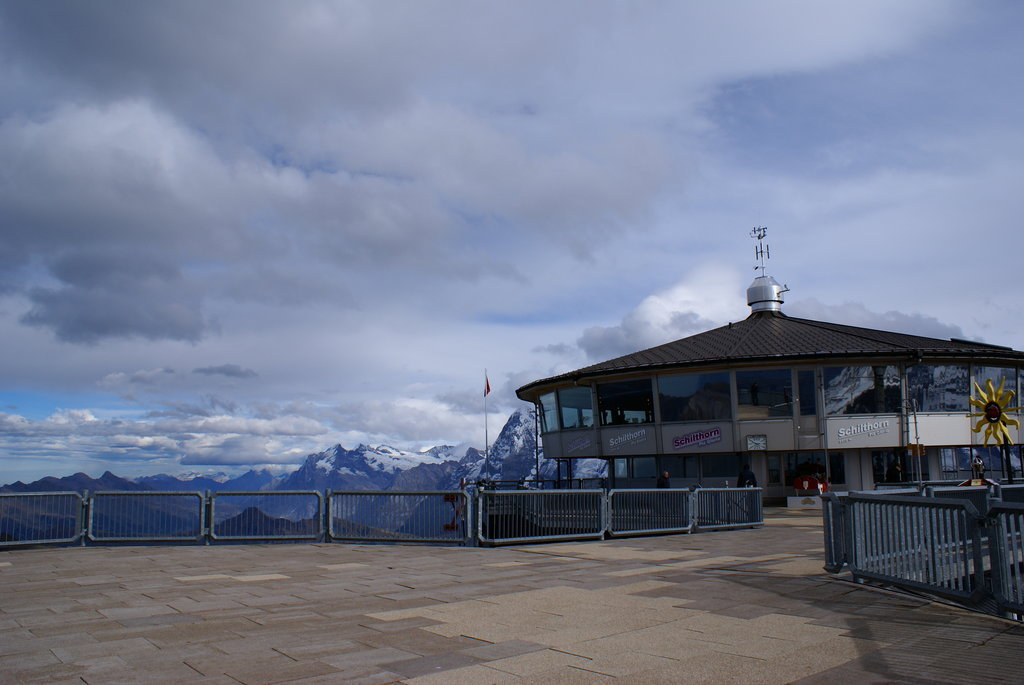
Piz Gloria is a revolving restaurant on the Schilthorn near Mürren in the Bernese Oberland, Switzerland

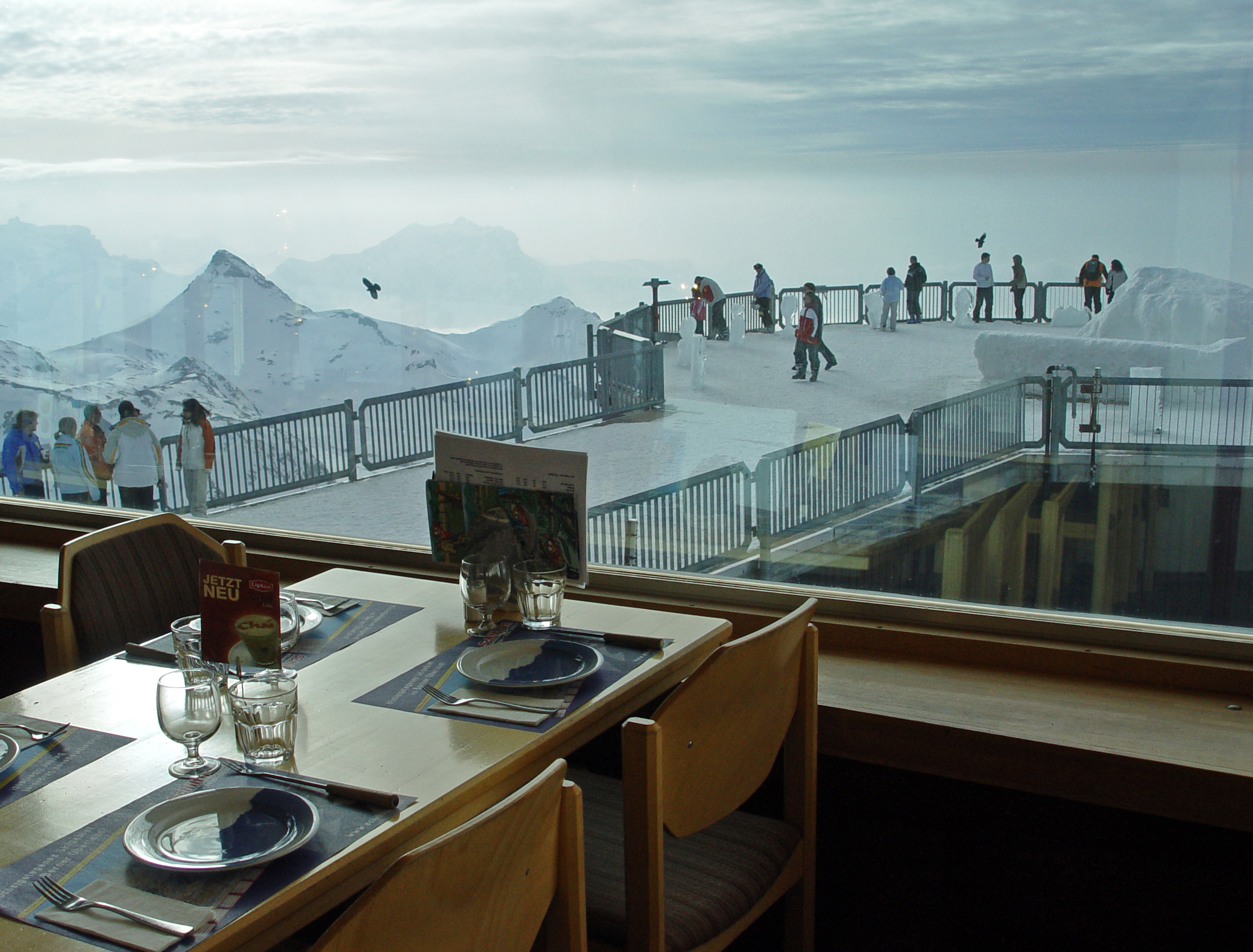
The walkway at Piz Gloria

Grindelwald

- Hotel Bellevue des Alpes (in a 19th century Alpine Grand Hotel)

Heimiswil

- Landgasthof Löwen (traditional inn from 1340)

Münsingen

- Wynhus zum Bären (traditional inn from 1371)

Mürren

- Piz Gloria (revolving restaurant)

Trubschachen

- Gasthof zum Bären (traditional inn from 1356)

Twann

- Bären (traditional inn from 1526)

=== Canton of Fribourg ===
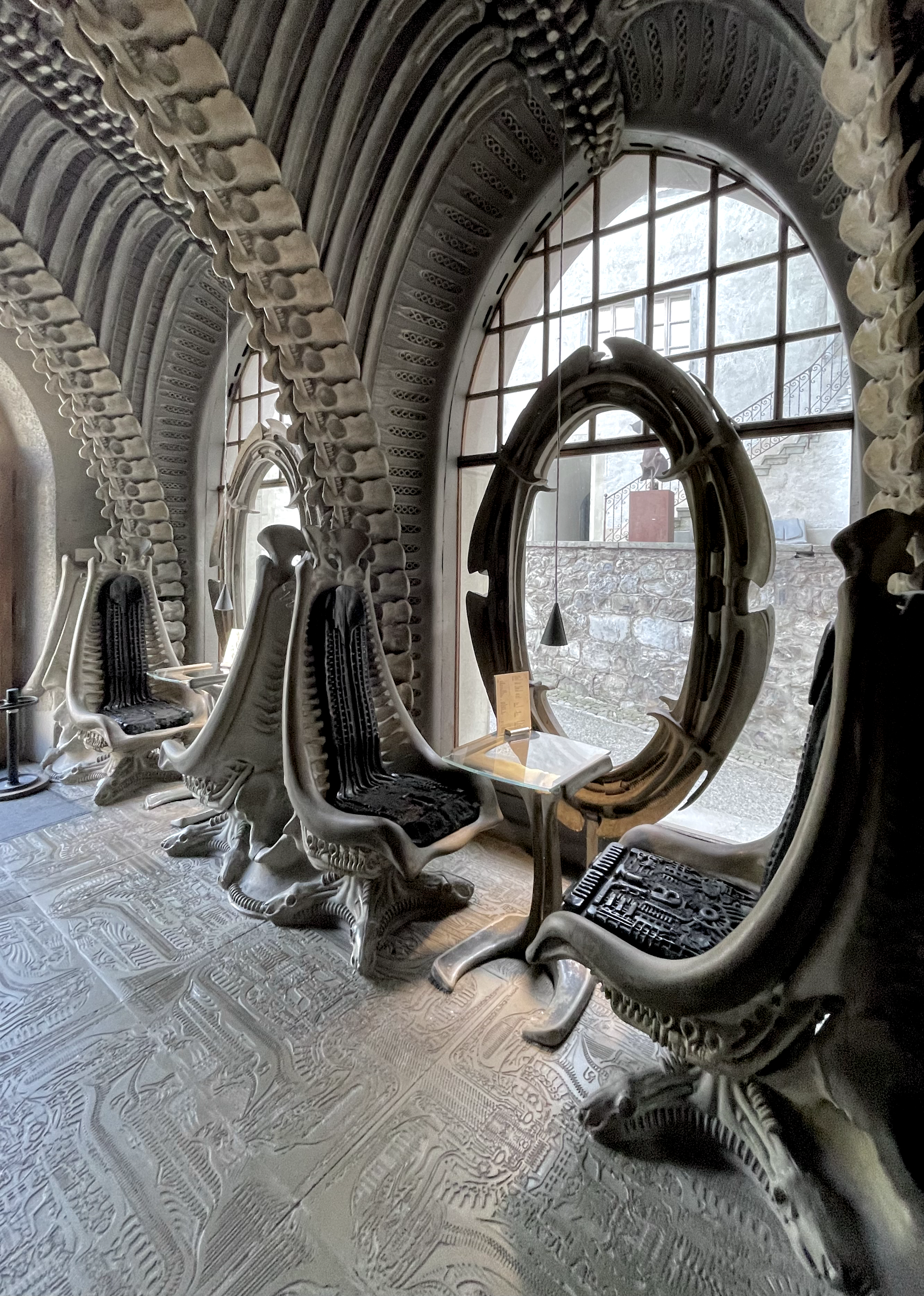
Museum HR Giger Bar

Gruyères

- Museum HR Giger Bar (bar modelled by H.R. Giger, the creator of the Alien)

=== Canton of Grisons ===
Champfèr

- Restaurant Talvo (gourmet restaurant)

Chur

- Giger Bar Kalchbühl (snack bar modelled by H.R. Giger, the creator of the Alien)

=== Canton of Obwalden ===
Sachseln

- Hotel Paxmontana (restaurant in an Art Nouveau hotel with original furniture)

=== Canton of Schaffhausen ===
Neuhausen am Rheinfall

- Wörth Castle (view of the Rhine Falls)

Stein am Rhein

- Rother Ochsen (tavern and wine cellar from 1446)

=== Canton of St. Gallen ===
Berneck

- Maienhalde

Mosnang

- Gasthaus Hulftegg (bourgeois restaurant with panoramic view)

Rapperswil-Jona

- Jucker Farm Restaurant (Bächlihof)

=== Canton of Valais ===
Saas-Fee

- Mittelallalin (the world's highest revolving restaurant at 3,500 m /11,500 ft)

=== Canton of Vaud ===
Leysin

- Kuklos (rotating restaurant)

=== Canton of Zurich ===
Seegräben

- Jucker Farm Restaurant (Juckerhof)

Winterthur

- Gasthaus Sonne (historic inn)

Zurich

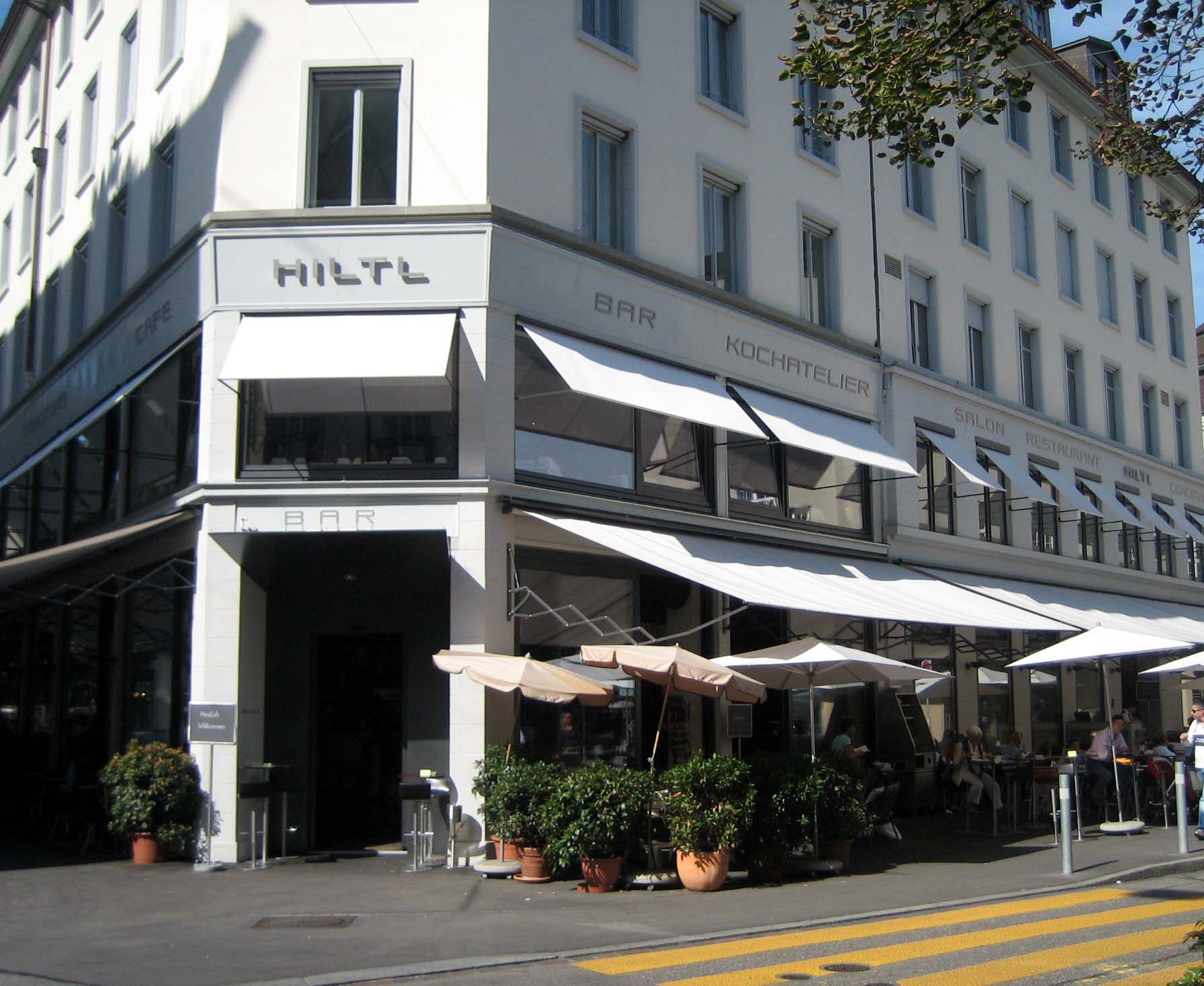
Hiltl Vegetarian Restaurant

- Bauschänzli (open-air restaurant on an island)
- Bernhard-Theater (theater restaurant)
- Blindekuh (dark dining)
- Café & Conditorei 1842 (the city's oldest café)
- Confiserie Sprüngli (Café & Restaurant)
- Grimmenturm (Cucina Itameshi)
- Hiltl Restaurant (oldest continuously open vegetarian restaurant)
- Hotel Storchen (gourmet restaurant)
- Hotel Widder (gourmet restaurant)
- Wild West Steak House Texas at Irchelpark
- Kronenhalle (Swiss Cuisine restaurant founded in 1924)
- Prime Tower (Clouds)
- Ristorante Cooperativo (historic Italian restaurant)
- Sternen Grill (popular grill)
- Theater am Hechtplatz (theater restaurant)
- Theater Rigiblick (theater restaurant)
- Urania Sternwarte (Brasserie Lipp/Jules Verne Panorama Bar)
- Villa Belvoir (restaurant in a park)
- Zunfthaus zur Meisen (in a guild house)
- Zunfthaus zur Saffran (in a guild house)
- Zunfthaus zur Zimmerleuten (in a guild house)

== See also ==
- Beer in Switzerland
- List of companies of Switzerland
- Lists of restaurants
- Swiss cuisine
