= Gasthof zum Bären =

Inn in Trubschachen, Bern, Switzerland

- Industry: Hotel
- Founded: 1356
- Headquarters: Trubstrasse 1, Trubschachen, Switzerland
- Key people: Fränzi & Urs Mäder-Künzi
- Website: www.aeltester-baeren.ch

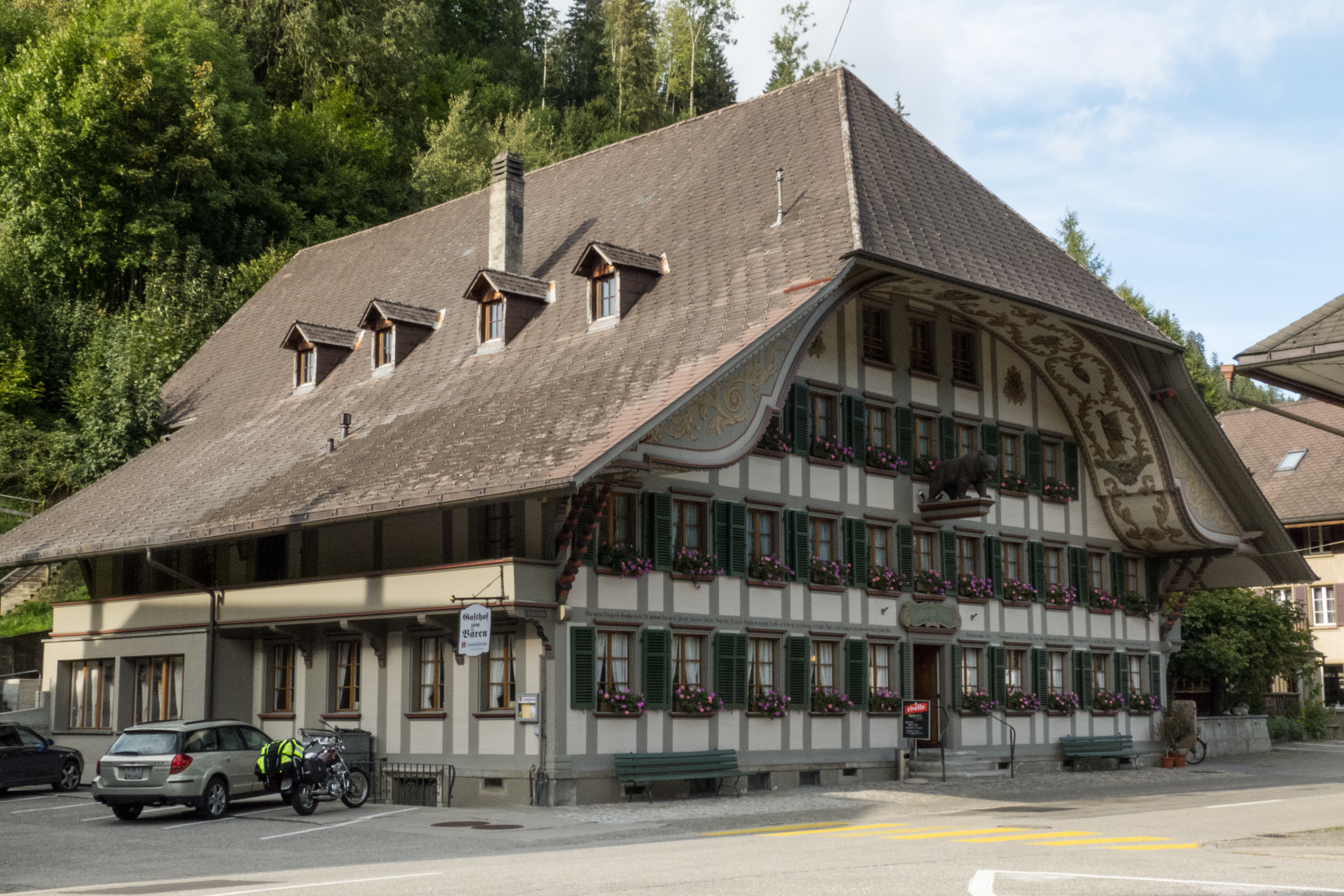
Gasthof zum Bären

Gasthof zum Bären is a traditional inn in Trubschachen village, Bern canton, Switzerland, first written record about it is from 1356. The official inn working (Tavernenrecht) started in 1569 and today it is a popular meeting point of the folk culture.

== See also ==
Media related to Gasthof Bären, Trubschachen at Wikimedia Commons

- List of oldest companies
- List of restaurants in Switzerland
