= Gasthof Sternen =

Inn in Wettingen, Aargau, Switzerland

- Industry: Hotel
- Founded: 1227/1230
- Headquarters: Klosterstrasse 9, 5430 Wettingen, Aargau canton, Switzerland
- Website: www.sternen-kloster-wettingen.ch

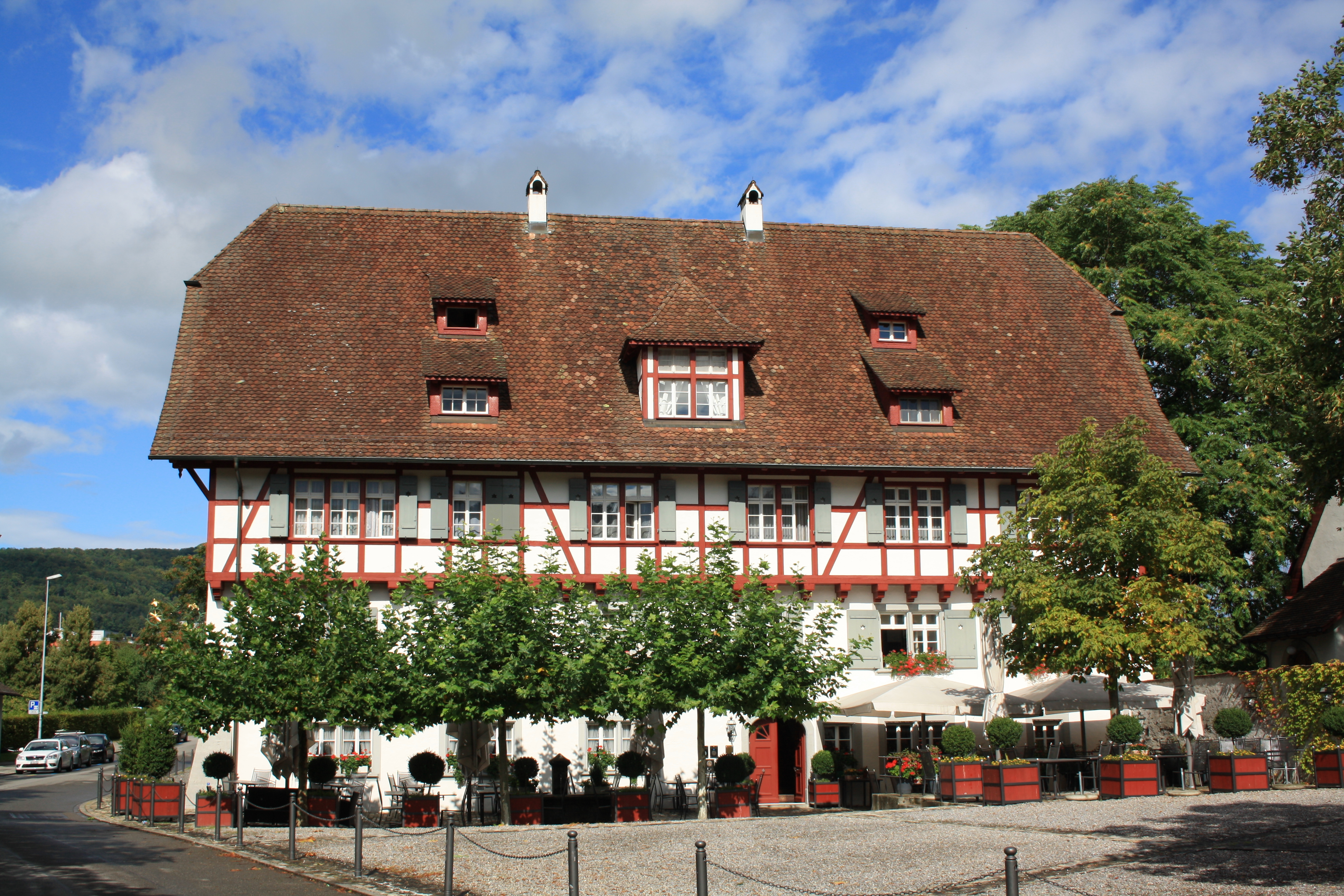
Gasthof Sternen

Gasthof Sternen is located in Wettingen Abbey and is the oldest inn in Switzerland. The building stands north of the monastery church and is under the cantonal protection.

== History ==
The origins of the inn date back to the monastery founding in 1227. In order to give a special visit for the mothers and sisters of the monks, a guest house was built around 1230, which was at first called "Weiberhaus". It was outside the monastery walls, since the monastery area was not allowed to be entered by women, but it was connected to the inner monastery gate. In the 19th century the building came into the possession of the Aargau canton, but until now the inn is named "Sternen" after the monastery "Maris Stella" ("Stern" in German means "star").

== See also ==
- List of oldest companies
- List of restaurants in Switzerland
