= Café & Conditorei 1842 =

Café and bakery in Zurich, Switzerland

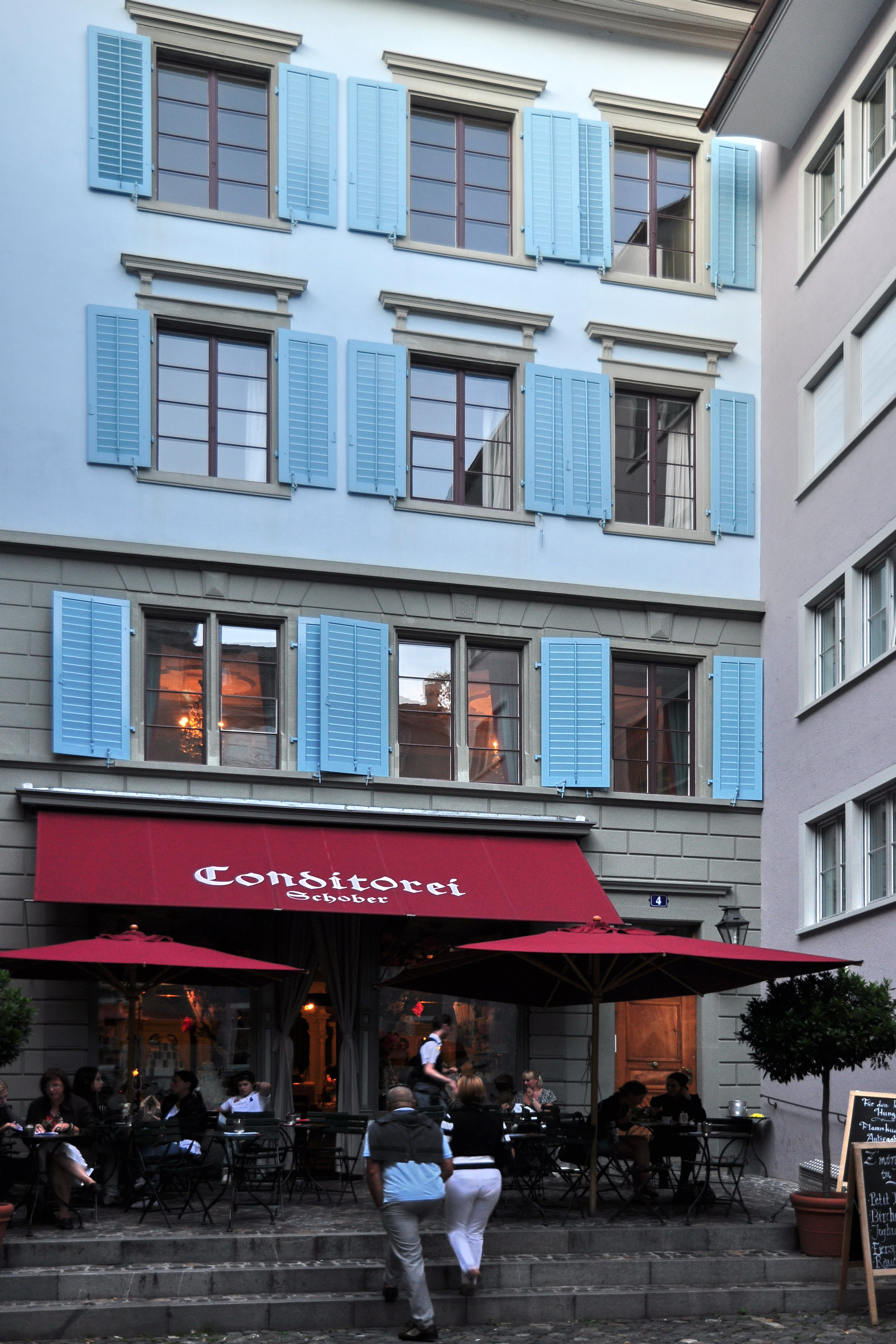
- The business in 2011
- Interactive map of Café & Conditorei 1842

Restaurant information
- Established: 1842 (184 years ago)
- Location: Napfgasse 4, Zurich, Switzerland
- Coordinates: 47.3714°N 8.5443°E
- Website: www.cafe1842.ch

Café & Conditorei 1842 is a café and confectionary in Zurich, Switzerland. Established in 1842, it is the oldest café in the city. Located on Napfgasse, near the old town's Grossmünster, the café is on six floors, including a basement.

Eberles Süsskramladen was established by baker Johann Georg Eberle in 1842. In 1874, Eberle's son, Julius Carl Heinrich, sold the business to family friend Theodor Schrober, who renamed it Conditorei von Thomas Schober. Both the Eberles and Schrober were from Pfullendorf, Germany. In 2011, it was the Conditorei Schrober Tearoom. Restaurateur Michel Péclard later owned the establishment, which he renamed Conditorei Péclard im Schober. It was named Café & Conditorei 1842 in 2019 by its current owners, the Arbeitskette Foundation.

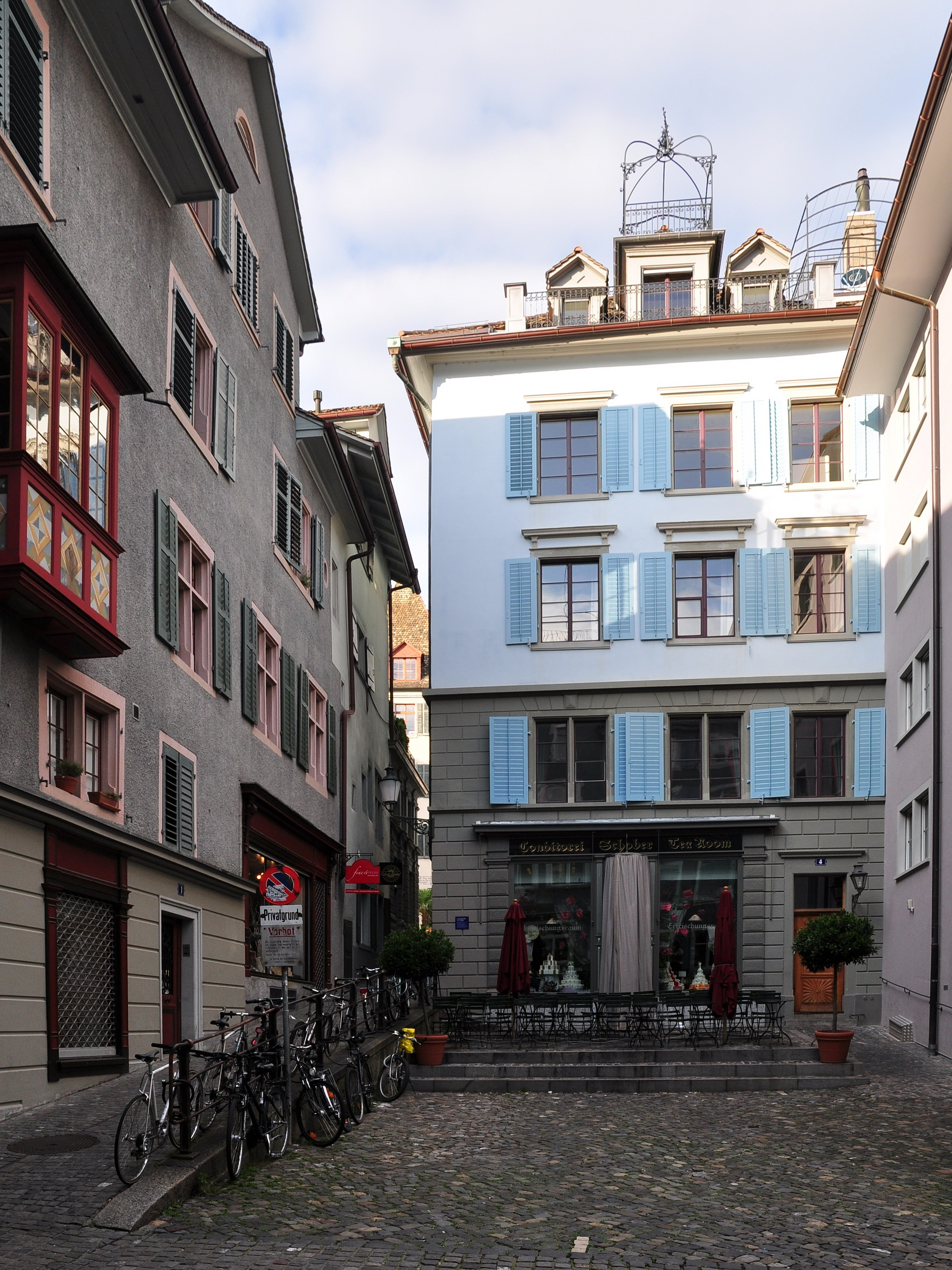
A wider view of the building, taken from Münstergasse

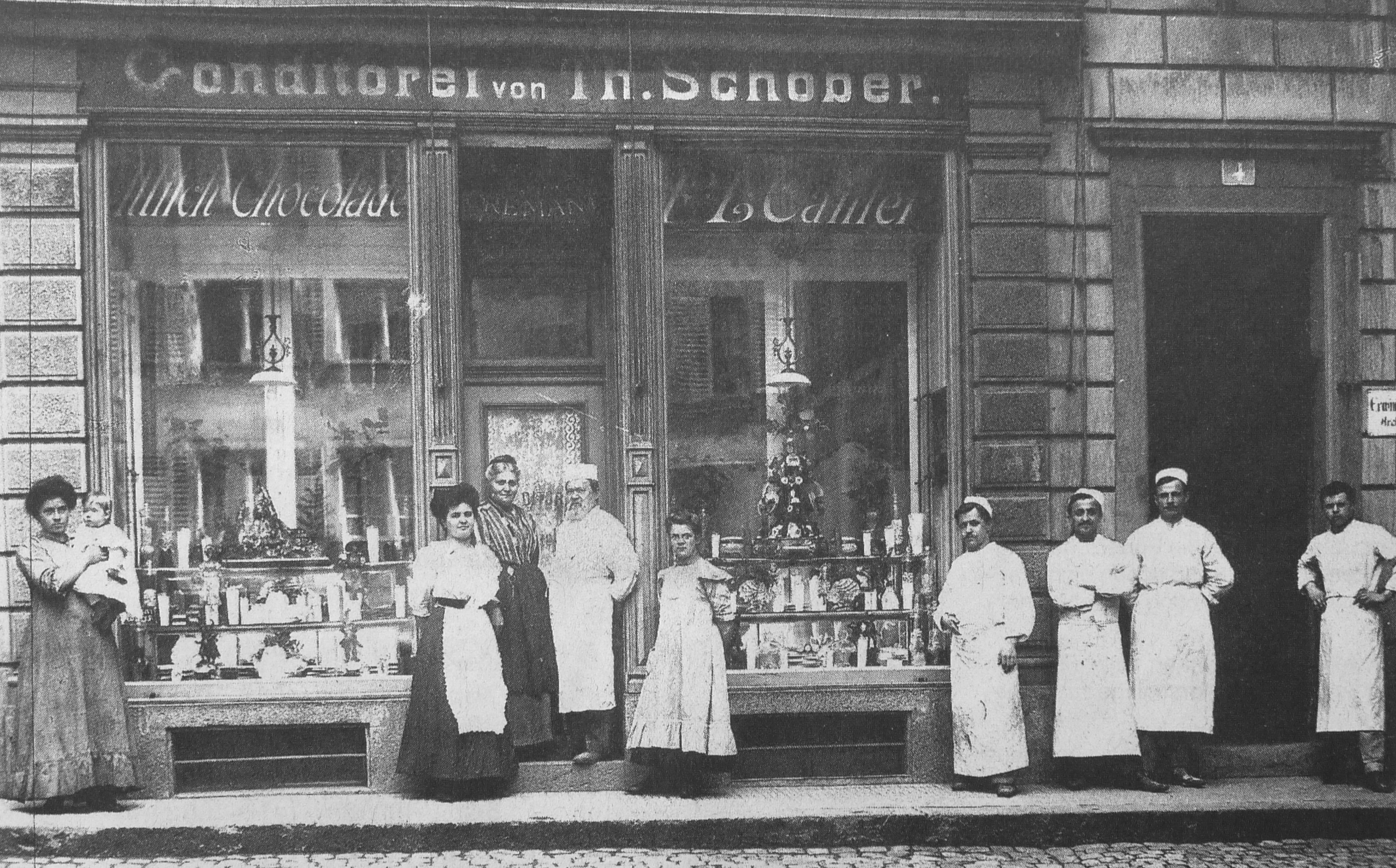
The café in 1890

== See also ==
- List of restaurants in Switzerland
