= Abraham Ltd. =

- Native name: Ludwig Abraham & Co. Seiden AG
- Formerly: Königsberger & Rüdenberg, Abraham Brauchbar & Cie, Rudolf Brauchbar & Co
- Type: Private
- Industry: Silk, Fabrics
- Founded: 1878; 148 years ago as Königsberger & Rüdenberg; 1943; 83 years ago as Ludwig Abraham & Co Seiden AG; Zurich, Switzerland
- Defunct: 2007
- Fate: Bankruptcy
- Headquarters: Zurich, Switzerland
- Key people: Gustav Zumsteg

Abraham Ltd. colloquially also Abraham Silks was a Swiss textile company specialized in silk fabric design primarily for haute couture and ready-to-wear.

Founded in 1878, the textile house became widely known under the management of Gustav Zumsteg, who supplied fabrics to Yves Saint Laurent, Balenciaga, Jacques Fath,Hubert de Givenchy, Edward Molyneux, Christian Dior, Chanel, Emanuel Ungaro and Oscar de la Renta.
