= Wynhus zum Bären =

Historic Swiss Inn and Tavern

Restaurant Bären 1371
- Native name: Restaurant Bären Münsingen
- Industry: Restaurant
- Founded: 1371
- Headquarters: Bernstrasse 26, 3110 Münsingen, Switzerland
- Key people: Ricardo Perpétua
- Website: www.baeren-muensingen.ch

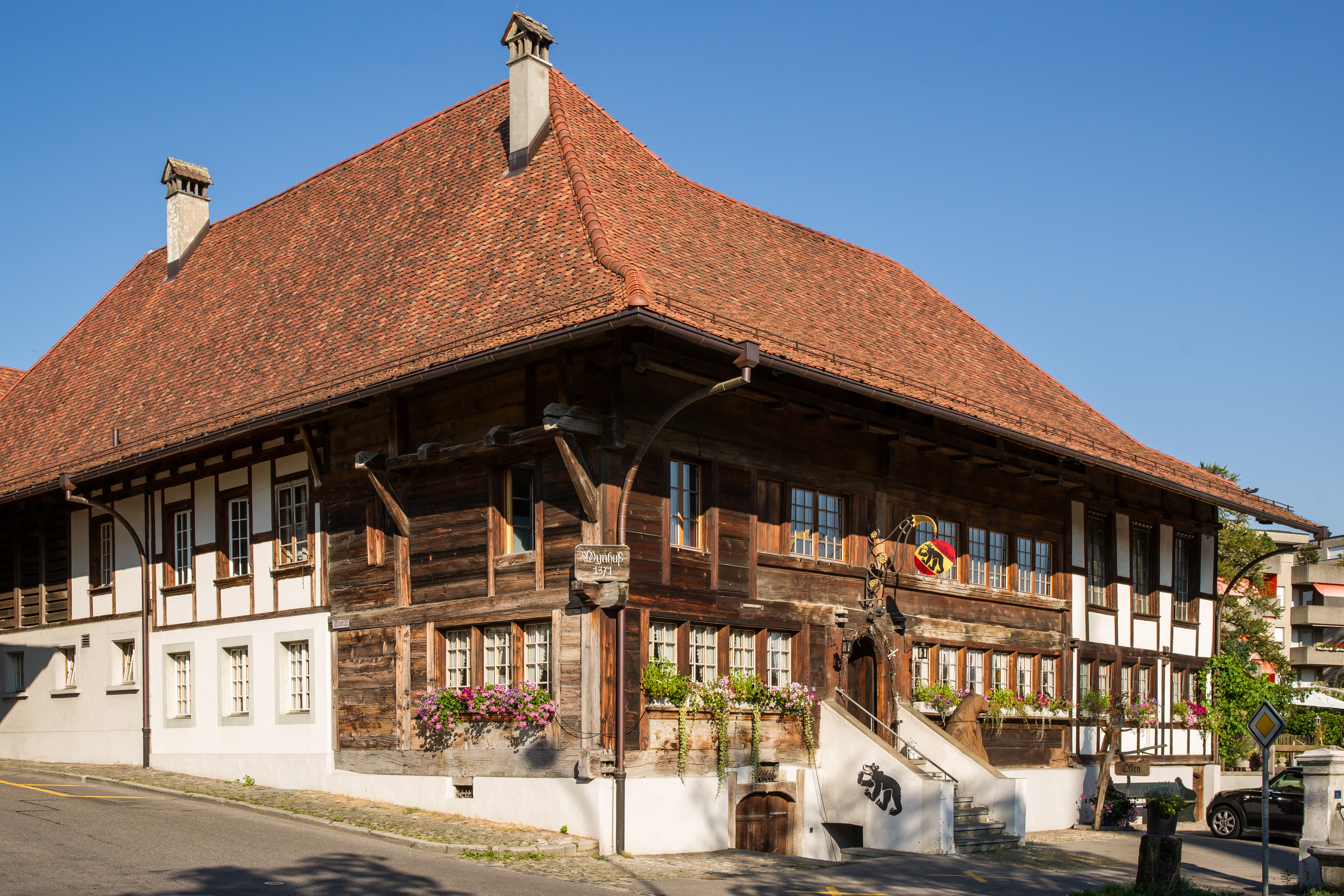
Wynhus zum Bären

Restaurant Bären Münsingen is a traditional inn founded in 1371 and located in Münsingen, Bern canton, Switzerland. It is one of the oldest Swiss taverns and the recent wooden building is from 16th century. At that time there was a post office and a place for "Postkutscher" (post coachmen) to change their horses.

== See also ==
Media related to Wynhus zum Bären at Wikimedia Commons

- List of oldest companies
- List of restaurants in Switzerland
