= Ristorante Cooperativo =

The Ristorante Cooperativo, colloquially known as Coopi, is a restaurant in Zürich, Switzerland, known for its association with 20th-century left-wing political figures as well as the anti-fascist, trade union and Italian immigrant movements in Switzerland.

The restaurant's roots are in the Società Cooperativa Italiana Zurigo, founded by Italian immigrants in 1905 for "furthering Socialist cooperation". Apart from a library, the society also founded the Ristorante Cooperativo to allow immigrants to eat at affordable prices, and continues to operate it today.

During World War II, the Cooperativo became a nexus of Socialist resistance against European Fascism, as many exiled Italian socialists fled to Switzerland. Among them was Filippo Turati, the founder of the Italian Socialist Party, whose bust still graces the restaurant. The Coopi was also where the Avanti! and L'Avvenire dei Lavoratori were being edited during the war years. These newspapers, the only Italian-language media in opposition to the Fascist regime at the time, were regularly being smuggled from Zürich to Italy in double-bottomed suitcases.

In the post-war years, the restaurant became a meeting-point of the Zürich left-wing intelligentsia, particularly during the student movement's heyday in the late 1960s. The later Federal Councillor Moritz Leuenberger was among the Coopi's regular guests as a student. Led by the later National Councillor Ezio Canonica, the Coopi was also the base of the opponents of James Schwarzenbach's anti-immigration initiatives of the 1960s.

In its time, the Coopi has seen many internationally famous patrons. While still a member of the Italian Socialist Party, the later Italian Fascist leader Benito Mussolini ate at the Coopi in 1913 after speaking at the May Day festivities in Zürich. Vladimir Lenin is reported to have eaten his last meal in Switzerland at the Coopi before covertly traveling to Russia in 1917, and the German communist writer Bertolt Brecht also patronised the restaurant during his stay in Switzerland. Brecht is said to have asked why the restaurant had a portrait of Karl Marx but lacked those of Soviet leaders Lenin and Joseph Stalin, and was told that the Coopi was "not a place for dictators, not even on the walls". More recently, Gerhard Schröder, then still Chancellor of Germany, ate at the restaurant after opening a Schang Hutter vernissage in 2004.

Originally located at the Zwinglistrasse, the restaurant moved to the Militärstrasse 36 in 1912 and to the Strassburgstrasse 5, in 1970 (47.3727°N 8.5282°E). In 2006, the media reported that the Coopi may have to close its doors in 2007 because the city government intends to increase the rent for the restaurant building which it owns. According to the Società Cooperativa, replacing the 1970s flexible rent arrangement with a current market level rent would ruin the restaurant.

In 2008, it moved to St. Jakobstrasse 6 (47.3737°N 8.5281°E).

== See also ==
- List of restaurants in Switzerland
