= Restaurant Talvo =

Restaurant in Switzerland

Coordinates: 46°28′42″N 9°48′43″E

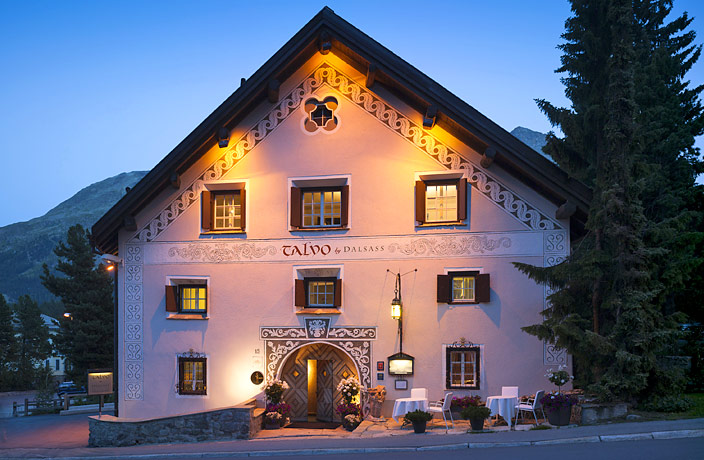
The main entrance of the Talvo with its typical engadin Sgraffito-ornaments on its façade. The historic farm house was built in 1658.

The Restaurant Talvo is a traditional gourmet restaurant in a historic building at the Via Gunels in the village of Champfèr in the Engadin in Switzerland. For a certain time the restaurant was once managed by the Badrutt's Palace Hotel.

The Talvo became famous in the 1960s and 1970s when the international Jet set discovered St. Moritz and its surroundings as their favourite winter destination. People like Gunther Sachs, Brigitte Bardot, Gianni Agnelli and the Shah of Iran, Mohammad Reza Pahlavi, were regular visitors of the Talvo. The Shah of Iran used to own a mansion in St. Moritz in an area known as Suvretta, near the hotel Suvretta House. When going to the Talvo, the Shah was always escorted by his bodyguards and police officers of the Swiss Federal Police.

== History ==
The large former farm house which is now known as the Talvo, (Romansh language in the idiom Putèr: barn), was built in 1658. From 1880 until 1887 it was the local schoolhouse for the seven pupils of the village and their teacher, Mr Luzi Battaglia. Afterwards the house was in the possession of the Walther family until 1949. Therefore, the house was also known as Chesa Walther. All in all four generations of the Walther family occupied the house. All of them were farmers. However, the last generation of the Walther family also started to rent out rooms to tourists.

=== Sale of the Chesa Walther to Dr Eduard Morger from Zurich ===
The biggest change in the history of the house occurred when the property was sold to the gynaecologist Dr Eduard Morger from Rüschlikon on the west shore of Lake Zurich. At the same time as he bought the historic Chesa Walther, Dr Morger bought all in all the following properties:

- The Chesa Walther, now known as the Talvo
- The Hotel Bristol
- The Villa Granita
- The Villa Nice

This large acquisition of properties by one single person was widely discussed in the Engadin at the time.

=== Conversion of the Chesa Walther into the Restaurant Talvo ===
With a substantial amount of money, Dr Morger converted the Chesa Walther into the Restaurant Talvo in 1954. After the conversion, the Talvo was also fitted with 30 guest beds.

Within only a few years, the Talvo became one of the most popular places for the Après-ski-society, but it was also a favourite with art lovers. Dr Morger, also a passionate art collector, furnished the Talvo with works of art from his own collection, among others with pictures of Ferdinand Hodler, Alexandre Calame, Pietro Chiesa (1876–1959), Gottardo Segantini (1882–1974) and Hermann Gattiker (1865–1950).

Over the years, the Morger family constantly improved the Talvo and its infrastructure. In 1960 a new terrace was built on the south front of the house. Only one year later, improvements to the basement and the ground floor were commissioned. On 10 October 1968 and on 3 December 1968 the building authority of St. Moritz granted the building licences to Mrs Yvonne Winterberg-Morger, a daughter of Dr Morger, and her husband, Mr Enno Winterberg, for the most significant structural alteration of the building since its conversion into a restaurant in 1954: An annexe on the south side of the Talvo to enlarge the main part of the restaurant. The annexe was built by the local construction firm Dipl. Ing. – ETH/SIA Andrea Pitsch from St. Moritz.

== From Jöhri's Talvo to Talvo by Dalsass ==
At the beginning of the 1990s the Talvo was bought by Roland and Brigitte Jöhri. They managed the restaurant themselves and called it Jöhri's Talvo. Roland Jöhri became one of the most famous chefs in Switzerland and again, the Talvo became one of the most celebrated restaurants in the area of St. Moritz. In 2011 Roland and Brigitte Jöhri retired. In the same year the Jöhri's sold the Talvo to the former Swiss National Councillor and owner of Stadler Rail, Peter Spuhler, and Michael Pieper, owner of Franke.

On 1 December 2011 the renowned chef Martin Dalsass and his wife Lorena took over the management of the Talvo, which they subsequently renamed as Talvo by Dalsass. The restaurant is awarded with 18 points by Gault Millau and one star by Michelin Guide.

== See also ==
- List of restaurants in Switzerland
