= Hulda Zumsteg =

Swiss restaurateur (1890–1984)

- Zumsteg at Kronenhalle in front of her own portrait by Varlin, 1980s
- Born: Hulda Durst; 12 November 1890; Winterthur, Switzerland
- Died: 14 July 1984 (aged 93); Zürich, Switzerland
- Occupations: Restaurateur, art collector
- Years active: 1924-1984
- Known for: Founding and leading Kronenhalle
- Spouse: Gottlieb Zumsteg (m. 1914; died 1957)
- Children: 2, including Gustav

Hulda Zumsteg (Swiss Standard German: [ˈtsʊmʃteːɡ]; née Durst; 12 November 1890 – 14 July 1984) was a Swiss restaurateur, co-founder and owner of Kronenhalle in Zürich, Switzerland. She was the mother of Gustav Zumsteg.

During her patronage she found acquaintance in many writers and artists such as James Joyce, Thomas Mann, Robert Musil, Bertolt Brecht, Jean Arp, Alberto Giacometti, Max Gubler and Henry van de Velde. She also had a special relationship to Yves Saint Laurent, who clad her in his gowns and was responsible for bringing the first art into the permanent Zumsteg collection.

== Early life ==
Zumsteg was born 12 November 1890 in Winterthur, Switzerland, to Peter Durst, an orthopedic shoemaker, and Hulda Durst (née Strahl; 1871–1895), originally being from Igersheim, Württemberg in the Grand Duchy of Baden. She had several siblings including; Mina Durst (born 1894).

She lost her mother at an early age and her father remarried soon to German-born Maria Theresia Pflüger, originally of Balg (presently part of Baden-Baden), through whom she had half-brother Peter Heinrich Durst (born 1899). She would have liked to become a school teacher but the family couldn't afford the studies; an offered scholarship was declined by her father.

Initially, she worked in a private household in Winterthur, and then entered the hospitality industry initially as a server at the Restaurant Mühle on the Bellevue (presently Haifischbar). There was also introduced to her husband.

== Career ==
In 1924, she acquired the dilapidated Kronenhalle restaurant, together with her husband. By that time the restaurant was already well known and frequented by notable personalities such as Gottfried Keller, Arnold Böcklin or Conrad Ferdinand Meyer. But the property needed a significant amount of investments in order to continue operations. Through a very frugal lifestyle they achieved to bring the restaurant back and become an institution for traditional cuisine.

== Personal life ==
Zumsteg already had two children when she met her husband Gottlieb Zumsteg (died 1957):

- Gustav Zumsteg (1915–2005), who was later adopted by Gottlieb Zumsteg and took his last name.
- Hedwig Durst, who was married to twice initially to a Mr. Meier then to Manfred Schuster; one daughter, Verena Gerhartz (née Meier), who had two daughters on her own and served on the board of directors of Kronenhalle.

Zumsteg died aged 94 in Zürich, Switzerland. She was known as the "mother" of the Kronenhalle by many.
