= Gustav Zumsteg =

Swiss art collector, silk merchant and restaurateur

- Born: Gustav Durst; 11 October 1915; Zurich, Switzerland
- Died: 17 June 2005 (aged 89); Zurich, Switzerland
- Occupations: Businessman, silk merchant, art collector
- Known for: Kronenhalle; Abraham Ltd. Zumsteg Collection
- Parent: Hulda Zumsteg (mother)

Gustav Zumsteg (Swiss Standard German: [ˈtsʊmʃteːɡ]; né Durst; 11 October 1915 – 17 June 2005) was a Swiss businessman, silk merchant and art collector. He was primarily known for his involvement in the silk industry as well as being the owner of the Kronenhalle in Zurich, Switzerland.

== Early life and education ==
Zumsteg was born Gustav Durst on 11 October 1915 in Zurich, Switzerland, the second of two illegitimate children of Hulda Durst (1890–1984) and an unknown father who died when was only eight weeks old. He also had an older sister, Hedi.

His mother being financially destitute out placed her children into the care of an elderly widow in Aussersihl, a predominantly working class area of the city. During his childhood there he learned French since his foster mother was originally from Jura. In 1930, aged 15, he moved back to his mother and her new husband Gottlieb Zumsteg, who later adopted him and he ever since bore his name, despite not having a good relationship with his stepfather.

In 1931, aged 16, he joined as an apprentice at the silk trading house Ludwig Abraham & Co, for which firm he later would go to Paris and eventually raise to become a partner in the firm.

== Professional career ==
=== Silk trading house Ludwig Abraham & Co ===
In 1931 he joined as an apprentice at the silk trading house Ludwig Abraham & Co - a business founded in 1863 under the name Königsberger, Rüdenberg & Co. in Krefeld, Germany, and that moved to Zürich where Jakob Abraham became a partner in 1878.

From 1936, Zumsteg lived in Paris, where he met the artists and couturiers personally. He also managed Abraham's Paris subsidiary from 1941 on, became the chief designer and in 1943 a partner in the company. In 1957 he met Yves Saint Laurent, whose collections were henceforth influenced by Zumsteg's designs and Abraham's fabrics.

In 1968, after the resignation of Ludwig Abraham, Zumsteg became the sole proprietor and director of the silk company. He mainly focused on textiles for haute couture and began Abraham's collaboration with well known Parisian fashion houses — not just with Cristóbal Balenciaga but also Christian Dior, Hubert de Givenchy, Coco Chanel, and Emanuel Ungaro. Abraham's Ltd will become one of the major suppliers of fabrics to the house of Saint Laurent.

However, the company did not manufacture the silk fabrics itself. The production was outsourced to manufactories in France and Italy who implemented the work of Paris and Lyon based design teams led by Zumsteg.

From 1970s on, the market for Haute Couture has gradually vanished due to the global end-of-an-era changes with cheaper silk prints from Asia and the rising mass market with easier to care for fabrics that did not need tailoring. With the design of prints for the high end of the ready-to-wear market, Zumsteg adjusted the business to the new situation.

By the 1990s, the silk company was operating at a loss, even after Zumsteg's injections from his personal fortune. After the 40-year collaboration with Abraham's longest client, Yves Saint Laurent, came to an end in 1995 and no successor to Zumsteg was found, Abraham's Ltd. ceased operations in 2002.

=== Restaurant "Kronenhalle" and art collecting ===
After the death of his mother, Hulda Zumsteg, in 1957, he took over the management of the restaurant Kronenhalle.

As an art collector until his death in 2005, he ensured that guests could dine in his Zürich restaurant surrounded by the works of world-famous artists -among others Joan Miró, Marc Chagall, Pierre Bonnard, Georges Braque, Alberto Giacometti and Jean Tinguely.

His private collection was auctioned in Zurich in 2006.

== Personal life ==
Zumsteg never married and had no children.
