= Landgasthof Löwen =

Inn in Heimiswil, Switzerland

- Native name: Löie Heimiswil GmbH
- Industry: Hotel
- Founded: 1340
- Headquarters: Dorfstrasse 2, 3412 Heimiswil, Switzerland
- Website: www.loewen-heimiswil.ch

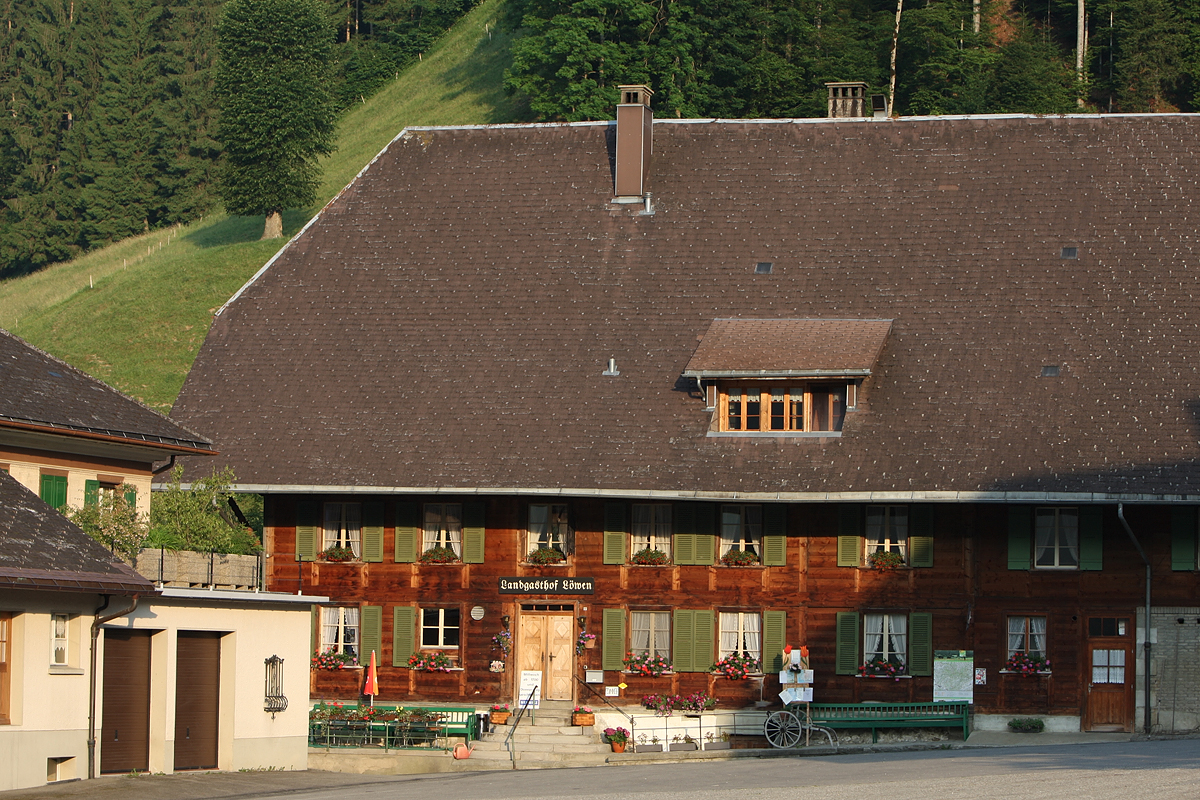
Landgasthof Löwen

Landgasthof Löwen is a traditional inn with a large hall and a sandstone wine cellar located in Heimiswil, Switzerland. The first written record about it is from 1340 and among visitors are many celebrities including the first Swiss astronaut Claude Nicollier.

== See also ==
- List of oldest companies
- List of restaurants in Switzerland
