= Kronenhalle =

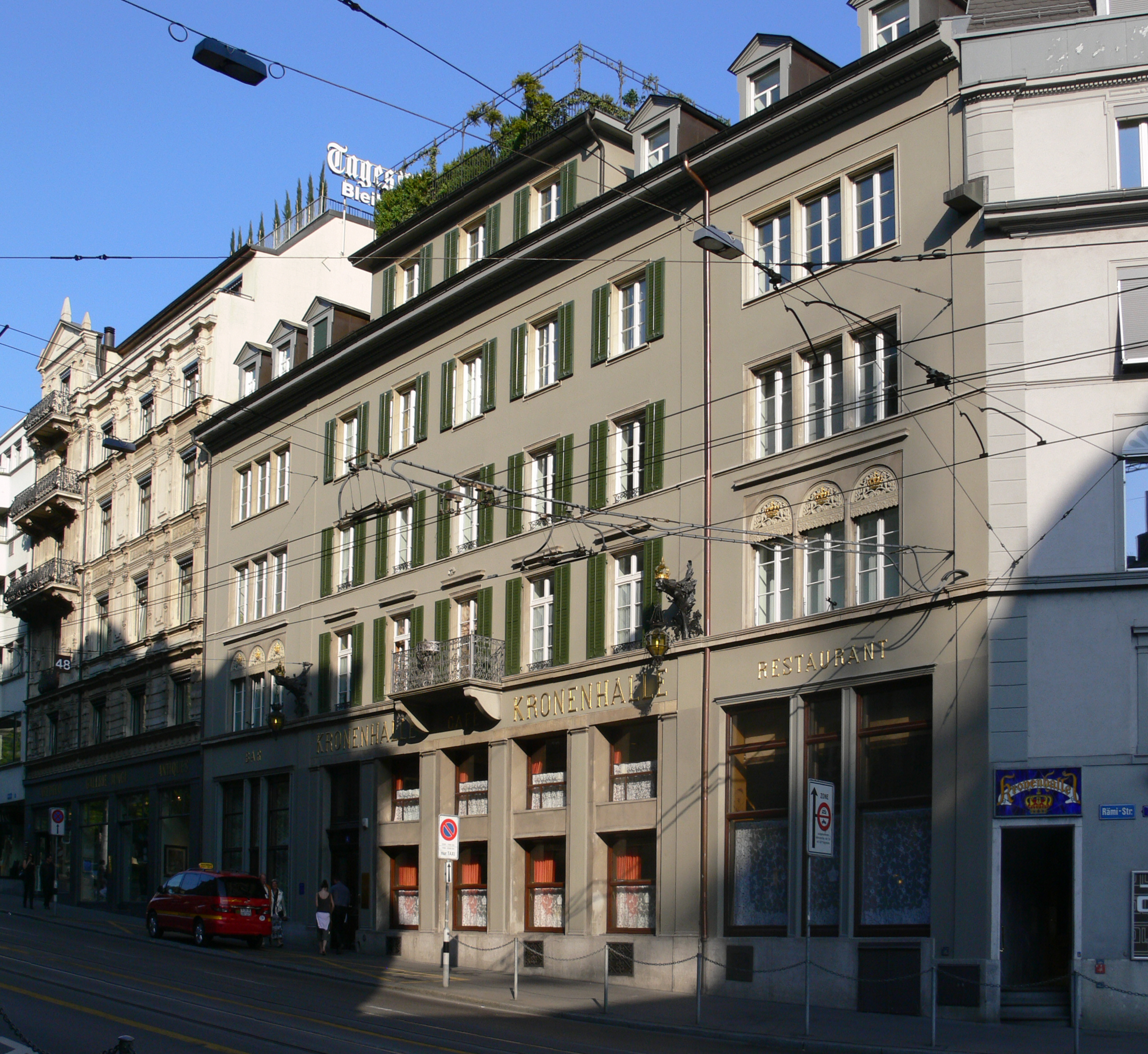
- Interactive map of Kronenhalle

Restaurant information
- Established: 1924
- Owner: Zumsteg Foundation
- Previous owner(s): Hulda Zumsteg; Gustav Zumsteg
- Food type: Swiss cuisine
- Location: Rämistrasse 4, 8001 Zürich
- Website: www.kronenhalle.com

The Kronenhalle (German pronunciation: [ˈkʁoːnənˌhalə]; known colloquially as Kronenhalle restaurant) is a Swiss cuisine restaurant in the Bellevue area of Zurich, Switzerland founded in 1924. It has been an institution for classic and traditional cuisine. Since Gustav Zumsteg, son of the founder, died in 2005 it is managed by his foundation which was established in 1985.

== History ==
The original predecessor, Hotel de la Couronne, was established in 1862 and was already frequented by famous people from Zurich. In 1924, Gottlieb and Hulda Zumsteg (née Durst), previously tenants in another establishment, acquired the dilapidated building and reopened as "Kronenhalle restaurant". Their speciality was a mixture of Swiss, Bavarian and other classic dishes such as Zürcher Geschnetzeltes, Wiener schnitzel, Chateaubriand and Mousse au chocolat.

Under the management of the Zumsteg family, the restaurant became one of the best and most well known in Zurich. Under Gustav Zumsteg, several art pieces and paintings where added to the restaurant. Since he did not have any children, the restaurant today is owned by the Zumsteg foundation which manages the establishment and the permanent collection of art.

== Art ==
The restaurant is also the home of the Zumsteg collection which was partially auctioned by Christie's in 2006. The permanent collection features the following art;

=== Chagall Hall ===
- Le coucher du soleil, Marc Chagall
- La Plaine II, Georges Braque
- Rudolphus Bruno, I. C. Fuesslin
- Manhattan, Lyonel Feininger
- Toeletta della sera, Giovanni Giacometti
- Stillleben, Chaïm Soutine
- Landschaft mit Mond und Stern, Joan Miró
- Hängender Vogel, Henri de Toulouse-Lautrec
- Deux bouteilles, Marc Chagall
- Mann am Tisch, Alex Sadkowsky
- Figur, Joan Miró

=== Main Entrance ===
- Bildbrief, Joan Miró
- La petite blanchisseuse, Pierre Bonnard
- Zwei Mädchen, Wassily Kandinsky
- Topfpflanze, James Ensor
- Blumenstrauss, Marc Chagall
- Gros Nuages, Georges Braque
- Bildbrief, Jean Tinguely
- Hulda Zumsteg, Pierre Alechinsky
- Hulda Zumsteg, Varlin
- Friedrich Dürrenmatt, Varlin
- Portrait James Joyce, Cuno Amiet
- Hand, Eduardo Chillida
- Moritz Schumacher aus Berlin, Anna Keel
- Minotauros mit Glas, Friedrich Dürrenmatt
- Peintre au travail, Pablo Picasso
- Les éclats du soleil blessent l’étoile tardive, Joan Miró

== Media ==
- SRF Dok: Inside Kronenhalle - Luxus und Tradition im Kultrestaurant; SRF 2024 (in German)

== See also ==
- List of restaurants in Switzerland
