= Gasthof zum Goldenen Sternen =

Inn in Basel, Switzerland

- Industry: Restaurant
- Founded: 1348
- Headquarters: St. Alban-Rheinweg 70, CH-4052 Basel, Switzerland
- Website: www.sternen-basel.ch/index_en.php

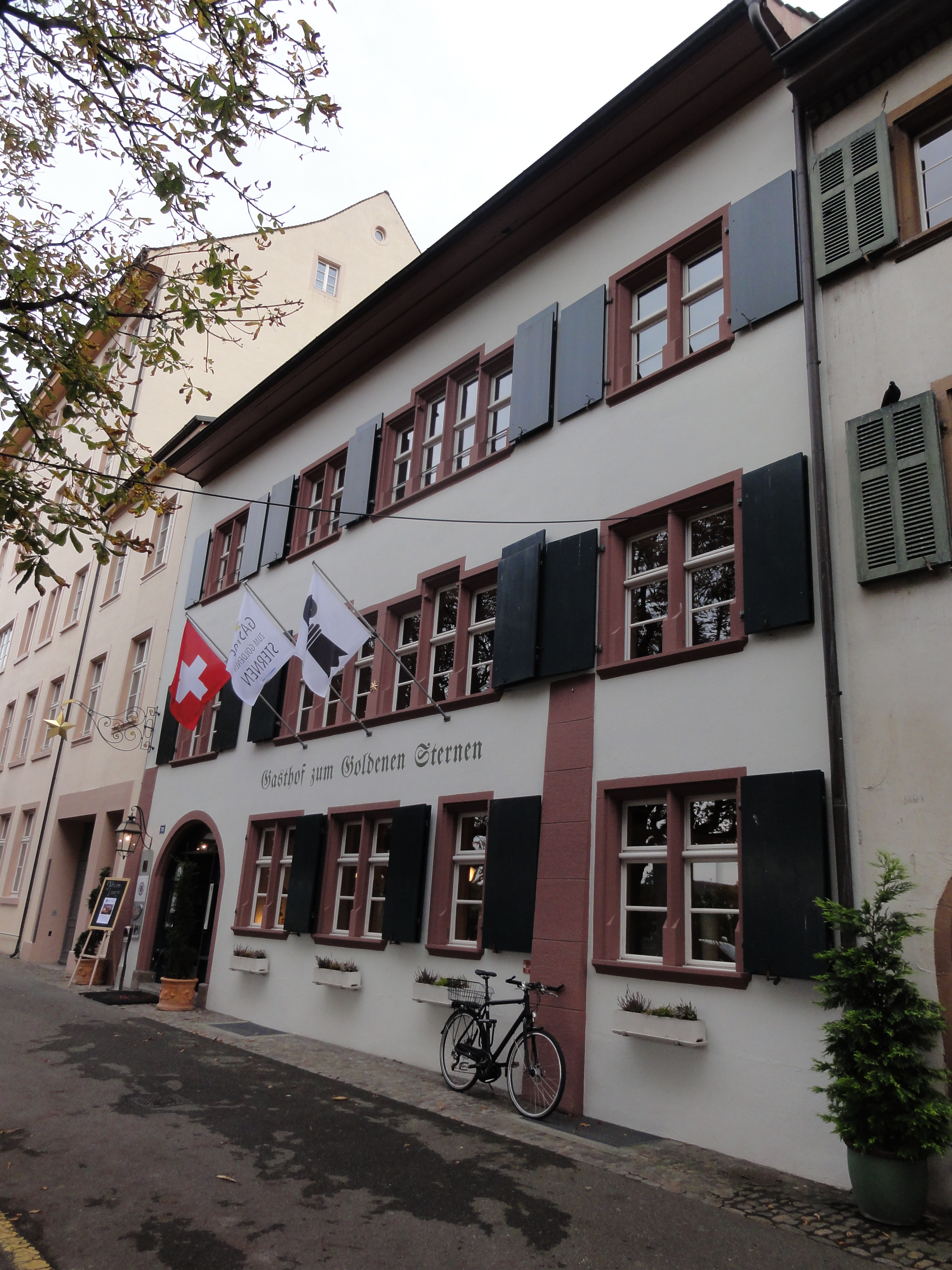
Gasthof zum Goldenen Sternen

Gasthof zum Goldenen Sternen is the oldest inn in Basel, Switzerland founded in 1349. It is a part of the Swiss history, because in its rooms on 13 July 1501, the ten messengers of the Federal States were received by the Baslers for a welcome drink. In 1964, for a road widening, it was relocated from Aeschenvorstadt. The building was dismantled brick by brick, and in 1973–74 it was rebuilt at St. Alban-Rheinweg to its original shape.

== See also ==
- List of oldest companies
- List of restaurants in Switzerland
