= Bären Twann =

Inn in Twann, Switzerland

- Native name: Hotel Bären Twann AG
- Industry: Hotel
- Founded: 1526
- Headquarters: Moos 36, Twann, Switzerland
- Key people: Anna and Marc Aeschlimann
- Website: www.baeren-twann.ch

Bären Twann is a traditional inn founded in 1526 and located in Twann, Bern canton, Switzerland.

The hotel runs the 4th generation of the family Aeschlimann and visitors can see views of the nearby Lake Biel.

== See also ==
- List of oldest companies
- List of restaurants in Switzerland
