= L'Avvenire dei Lavoratori =

L'Avvenire dei Lavoratori (Future of the Workers)
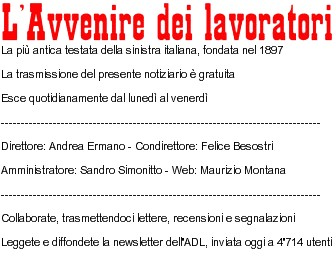
- Type: Quarterly newspaper
- Format: Newsletter
- Founded: 1897; 129 years ago
- Ceased publication: Discontinued from 1995 to 2000
- Relaunched: 2000
- Political alignment: Socialist
- Language: Italian
- Headquarters: Zürich
- Country: Switzerland
- Website: www.avvenirelavoratori.eu

L'Avvenire dei Lavoratori (Future of the Workers) is an Italian-language socialist newspaper, published in Zürich, Switzerland.

== History ==
Established in 1897 in Zürich, it was founded to support socialist activities in the Italian community in Switzerland, a community originally composed of economic emigrants and then, after the rise of fascism in Italy in 1922, also by leftist refugees.

During the newspaper's existence, it has counted on the cooperation of noted Italian Socialist politicians including Giacomo Matteotti, Pietro Nenni, Giuseppe Saragat, Sandro Pertini and Ignazio Silone, as well as the Swiss Italians Ezio Canonica and Dario Robbiani.

The newspaper was discontinued from 1995 to 2000.

== Publication and administration ==
It is published as a quarterly newsletter and as a collection of periodical essays, the Quaderni trimestrali (Quarterly Notebooks). It is directed by Andrea Ermano and the former Italian Left Democratic Senator Felice Besostri. It is edited at the offices of the Società Cooperativa Italiana, the Ristorante Cooperativo.
