= Gasthaus Sonne (Winterthur) =

Restaurant in Winterthur, Zurich, Switzerland

- Haus zur Sonne
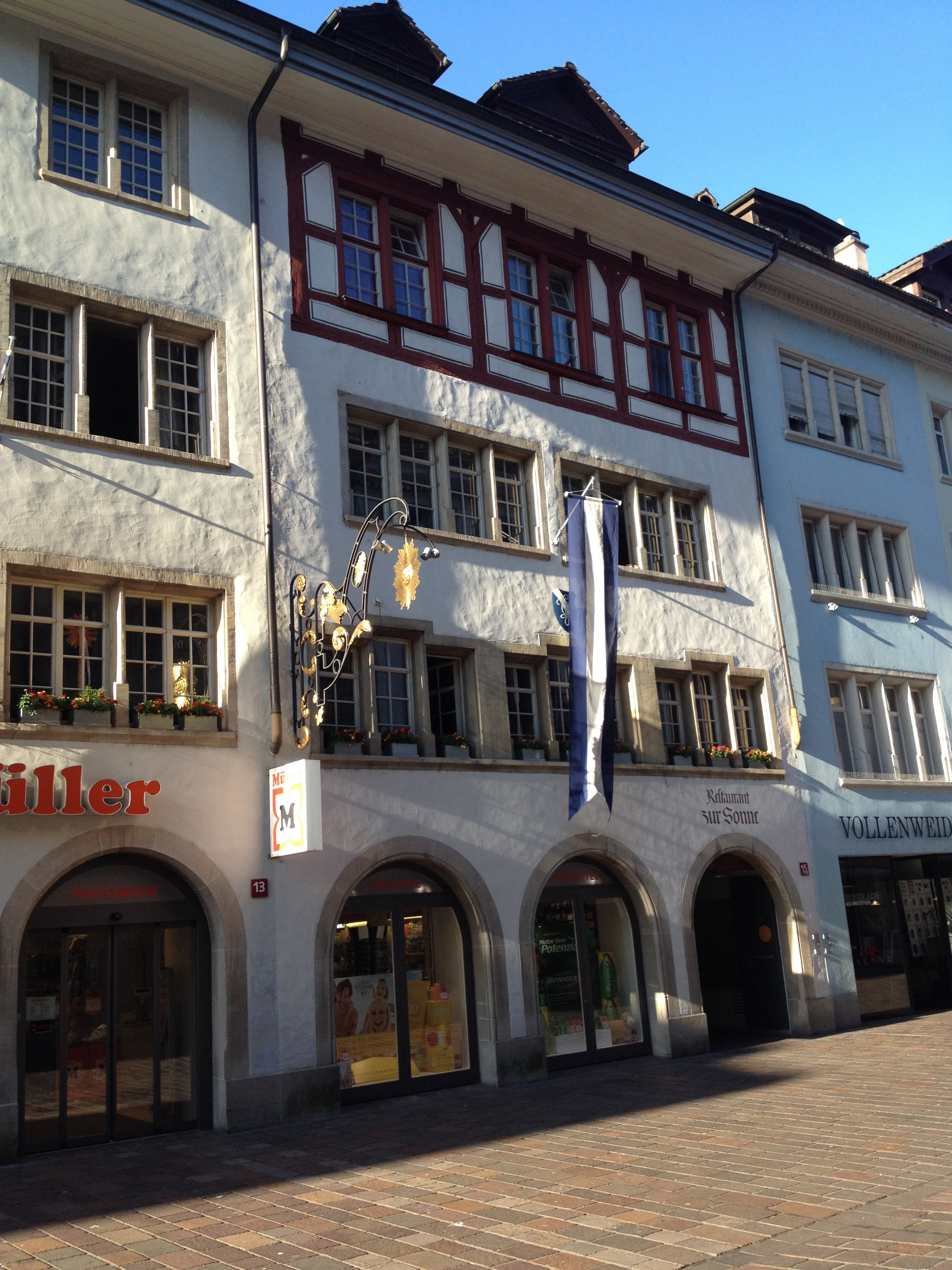
- Interactive map of the Gasthaus Sonne area

General information
- Type: Gasthaus
- Location: Marktgasse 13/15, 8400 Winterthur, Switzerland

Website
- www.zur-sonne.ch

Gasthaus Sonne or Haus zur Sonne is a historic gasthaus and restaurant in Winterthur, canton of Zurich, Switzerland. The establishment is first documented as an inn in 1483 and is described by its present operator as one of the city's oldest continuously operating restaurants, second only to the Hotel Krone, whose history dates to 1434. The building is listed in the Swiss Inventory of Cultural Property of Regional Significance (KGS no. 07798) and stands on Marktgasse, the historic main street of Winterthur's old town. (Note: The KGS number is confirmed via Wikidata's own citation to the underlying Swiss Inventory of Cultural Property of Regional Significance (February 2017); the primary federal inventory document itself would be a stronger direct source and should be substituted here if available.)

== History ==
=== Early history and the site ===
Archaeological excavations carried out in 1981 found evidence that the site was already in use as an earth cellar as early as the 11th century. The building's first documented mention as an inn comes from 1483, in a council record concerning a family dispute; the oldest surviving deed of sale for the property dates from 1495. The name "Sonne" is attested from 1600 onward.

=== The present building ===
The current building was probably constructed around 1557: the council's records show that the innkeeper of the time, Hans Rieter, was given a window by the city council that year, which is taken as evidence of a rebuilding, though this remains an inference rather than a documented construction date. The three-part staff window still visible on the first floor, and the hall-like large dining room behind it with its wooden beam ceiling, probably date from this period. In 1670, the council granted the innkeeper Heinrich Künzli six pounds toward a window, again suggesting a significant renovation at that time. The late-Gothic wooden ceiling of the main dining room, along with stone window pillars from around 1600, had been covered over with a thick layer of paint; both were uncovered and restored in 1945. The wrought-iron inn sign that still hangs on the building probably dates from the late 18th century.

=== 19th and 20th centuries ===
In 1800 the building passed into the possession of the Ziegler family, who held it until 1875, when it was sold together with the neighbouring building at Marktgasse 13 for a combined 124,000 Swiss francs to the Konsumverein Winterthur, a consumer cooperative founded in 1868. The Konsumverein set up its headquarters in the building and operated a shop on the ground floor, selling seafish in the courtyard from 1907 as a cheaper alternative to the comparatively expensive meat of the period. From 1925 to 1975 a cooperative bookshop was run on the ground floor. A 1981 to 1982 renovation gave the ground floor round-arched windows and exposed the half-timbering on the top storey.

=== Vitodurania and Vito-Haus zur Sonne ===
The Winterthur Mittelschulverbindung Vitodurania, a student fraternity founded in 1863, began using the Sonne as its regular meeting place in 1892, with a brief interruption between June 1896 and January 1898. The Altherrenverband (alumni association) of this fraternity founded the association Vito-Haus zur Sonne in 1999; the association bought the building the same year and has managed it since.

== See also ==
Media related to Haus zur Sonne (Winterthur) at Wikimedia Commons

- List of restaurants in Switzerland
