= Rother Ochsen =

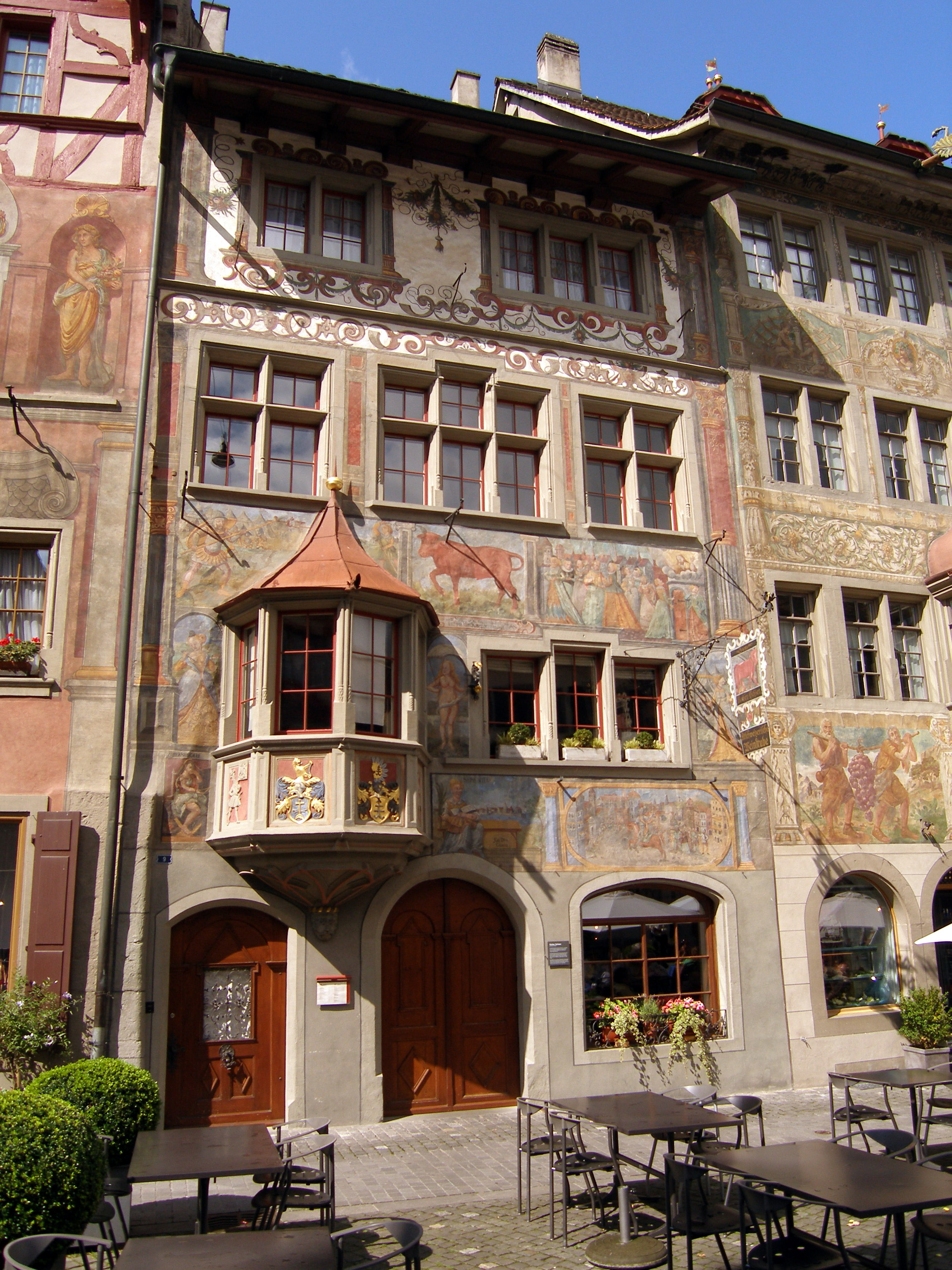
- Native name: Gasthaus Roter Ochsen
- Industry: Restaurant
- Founded: 1446
- Headquarters: Rathausplatz 9, 8260 Stein am Rhein, Switzerland
- Website: Official website (in German)

The Gasthaus zum Rothen Ochsen (lit. 'Guesthouse of the Red Ox') is the oldest tavern in the historic center of Stein am Rhein in the eastern part of the canton of Schaffhausen, Switzerland, founded in 1446. It is considered one of the most beautiful wine cellars in Switzerland and the facade is decorated with mural paintings.

== See also ==
- List of oldest companies
- List of restaurants in Switzerland
