= Champfèr =

Village in Graubünden, Switzerland

Coordinates: 46°28′40″N 9°48′39″E

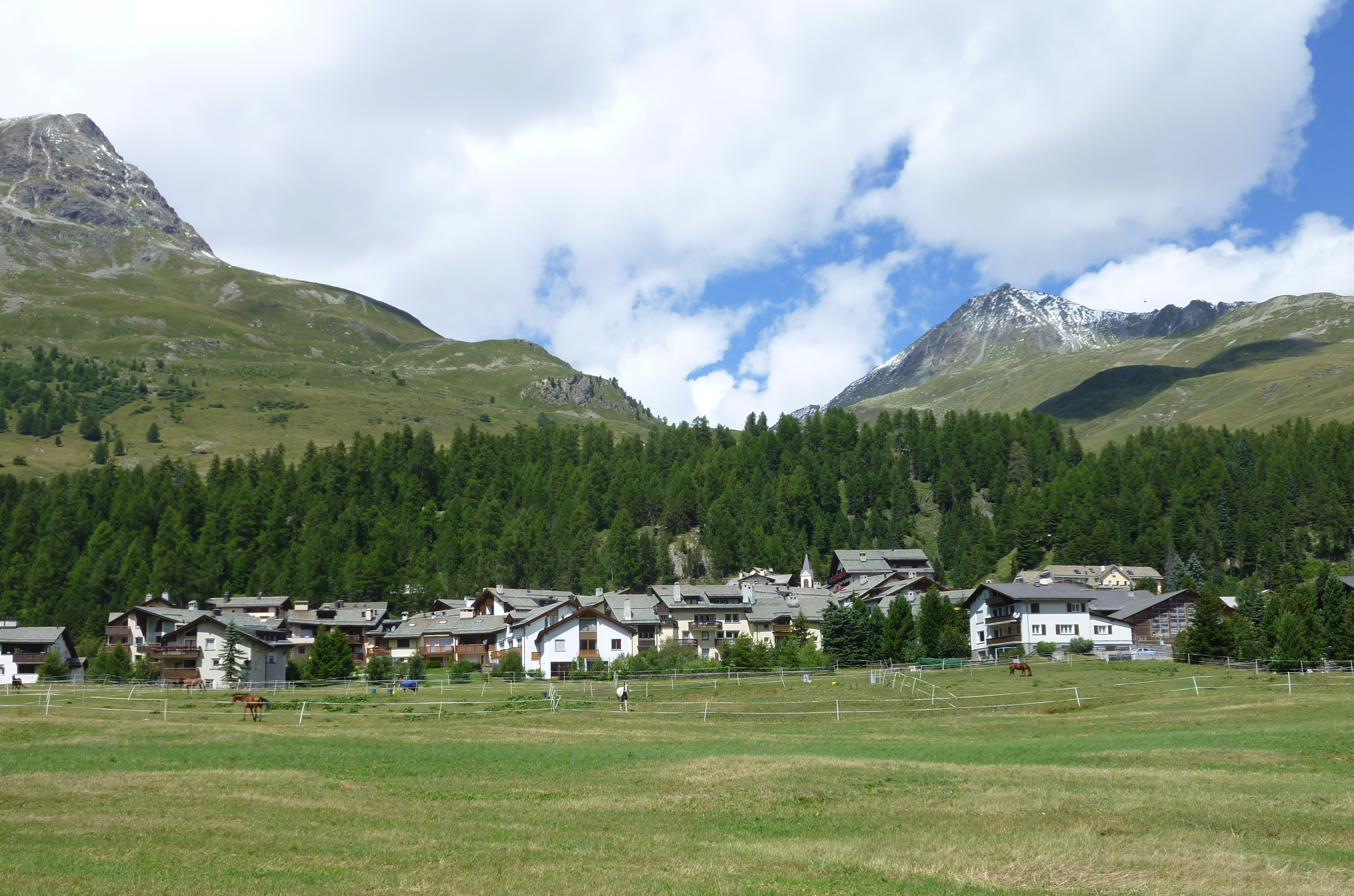
Champfèr

Aerial view from 200 m by Walter Mittelholzer (before 1920)

Champfèr (Romansh pronunciation: [tɕɐmpˈfɛːr]) is a village in the Upper Engadin valley of the canton of Graubünden, Switzerland. The Western part of the village belongs to the municipality of Silvaplana and part of the village belongs to the municipality of St. Moritz. The two halves of the town are separated by the creek Ova da Suvretta.

Lej da Champfèr, a basin of Lake Silvaplana, takes its name from the village.

The village used to house a convent that has since been converted to the hotel Chesa Guardalej. The village is also home to the famous restaurant Joehri's Talvo run until March 2011 by chef Roland Joehri and his wife Brigitte. The Michelin Guide has awarded the restaurant, located in an old farmhouse, two stars.

The etymology of Champfèr is unclear. One possibility is that it is based on a glacier. In 1129, its name was "Campofare", in 1471, Campher, and in 1519 Chiamfer (from Campus ferri). Another explanation could be that the name is meant to say fruitful fields or meadows, chan'ver.

The Church San Rochus was built in 1521.

The gourmet restaurant Talvo is located in Champfèr.

== Gallery ==
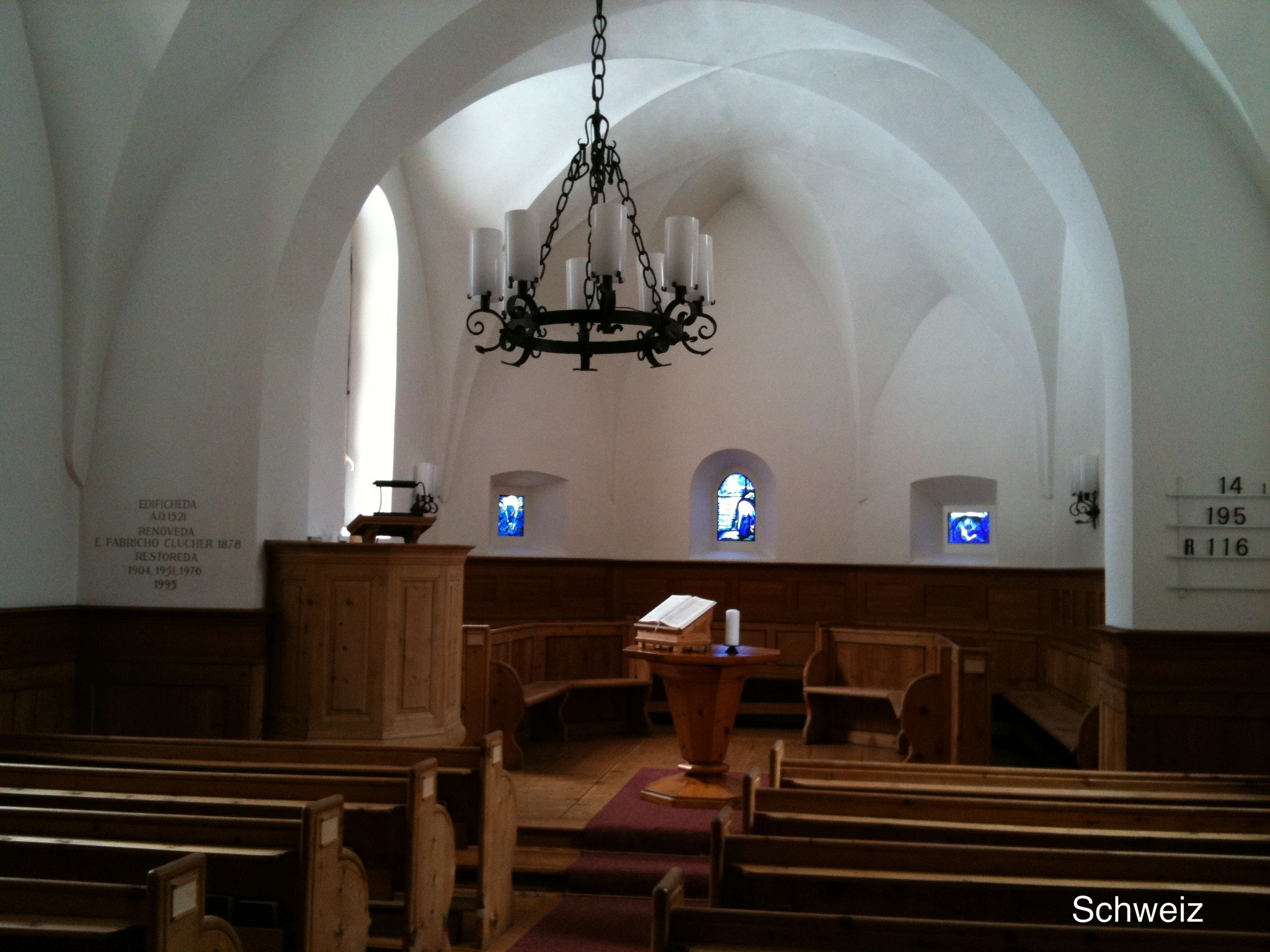
Church

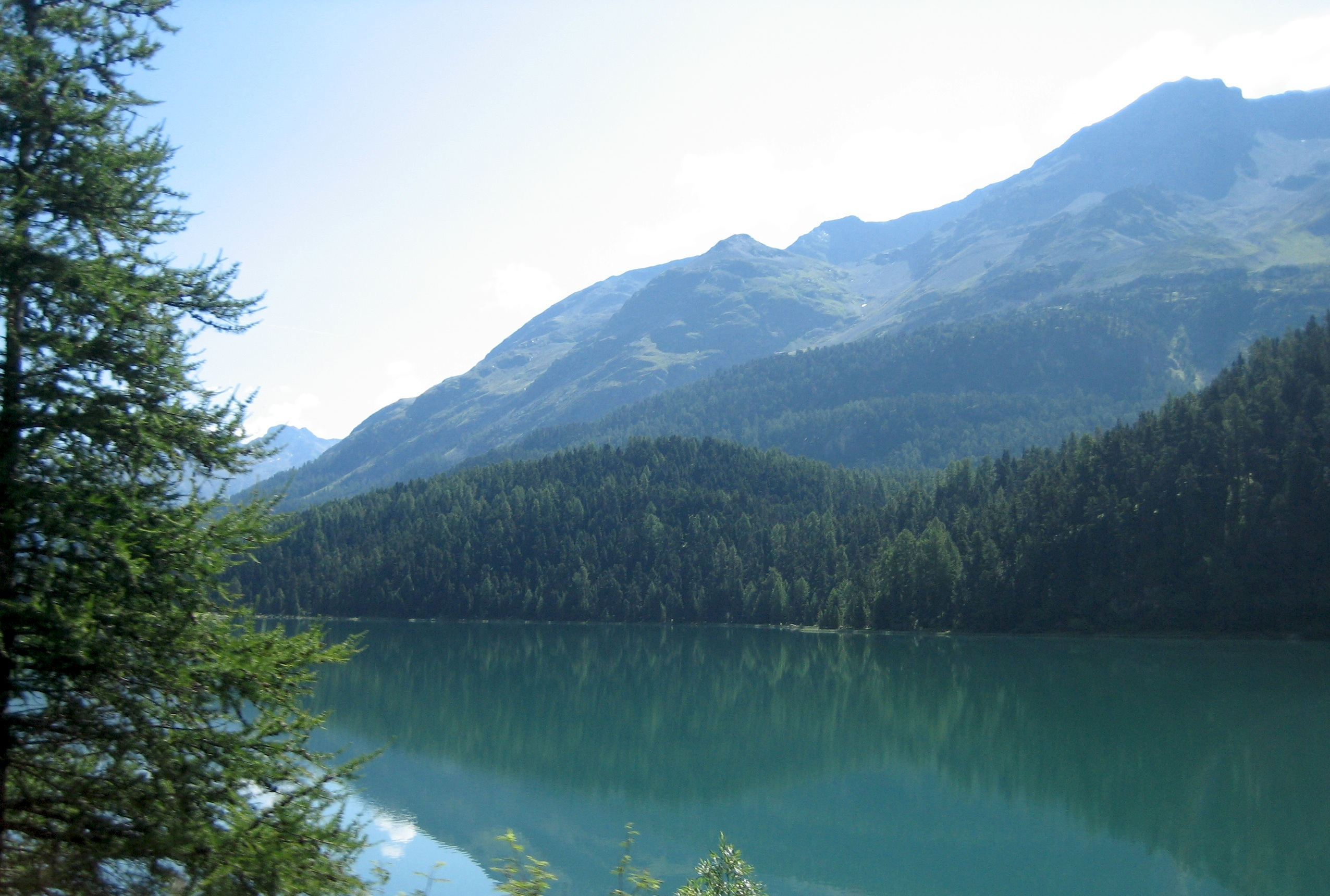
Lake

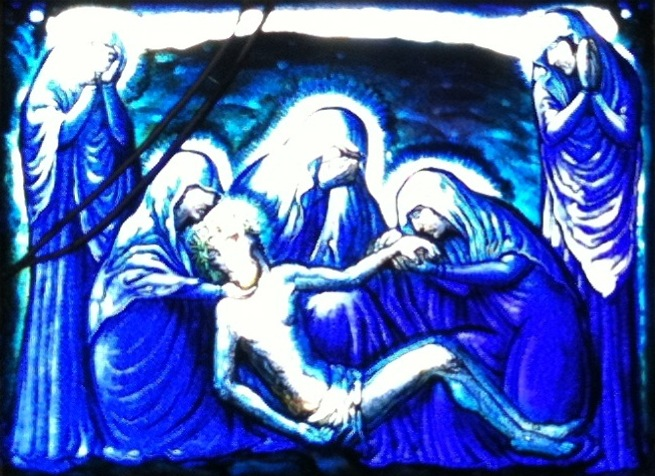
Vitreaux at the church

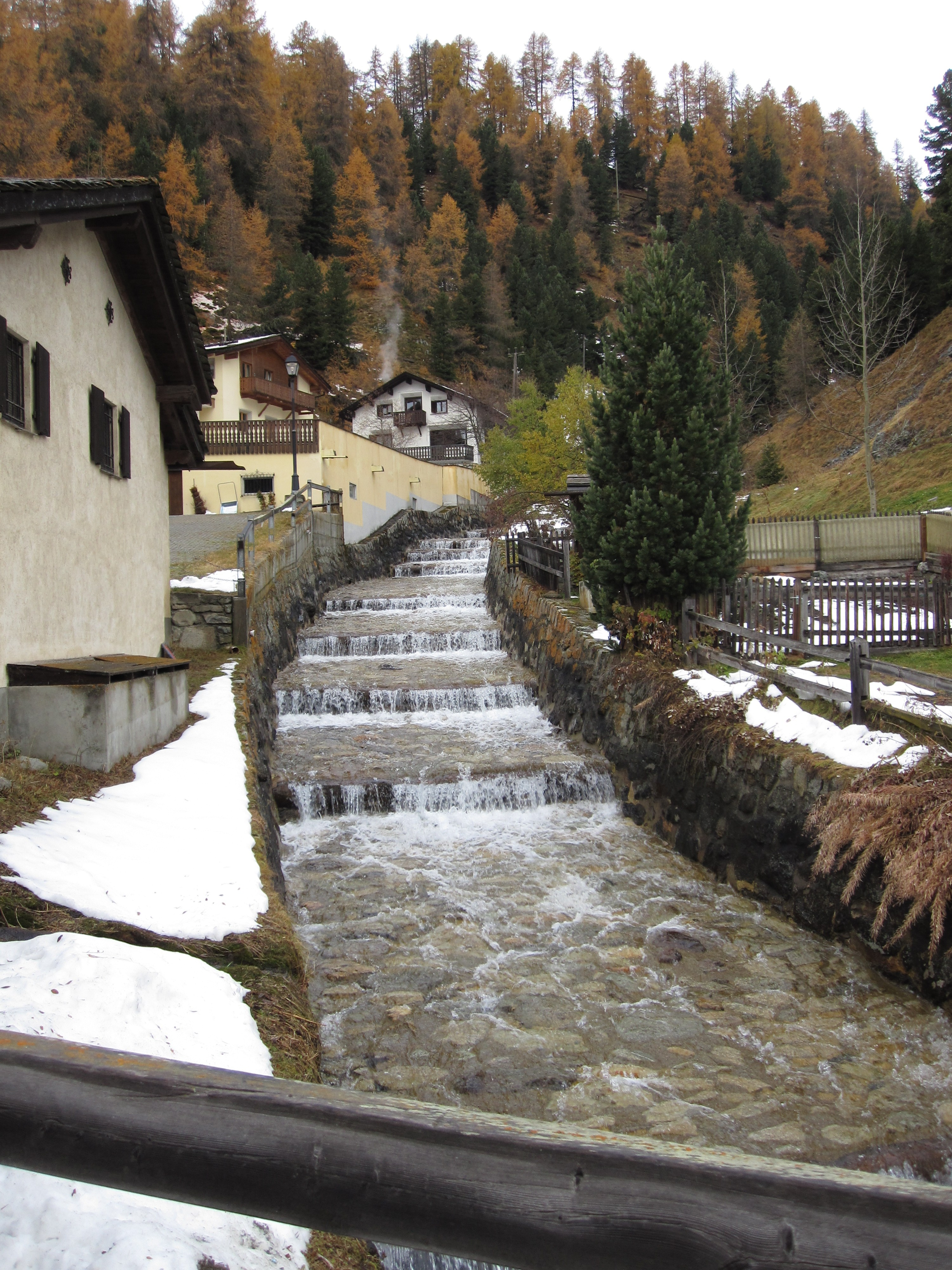

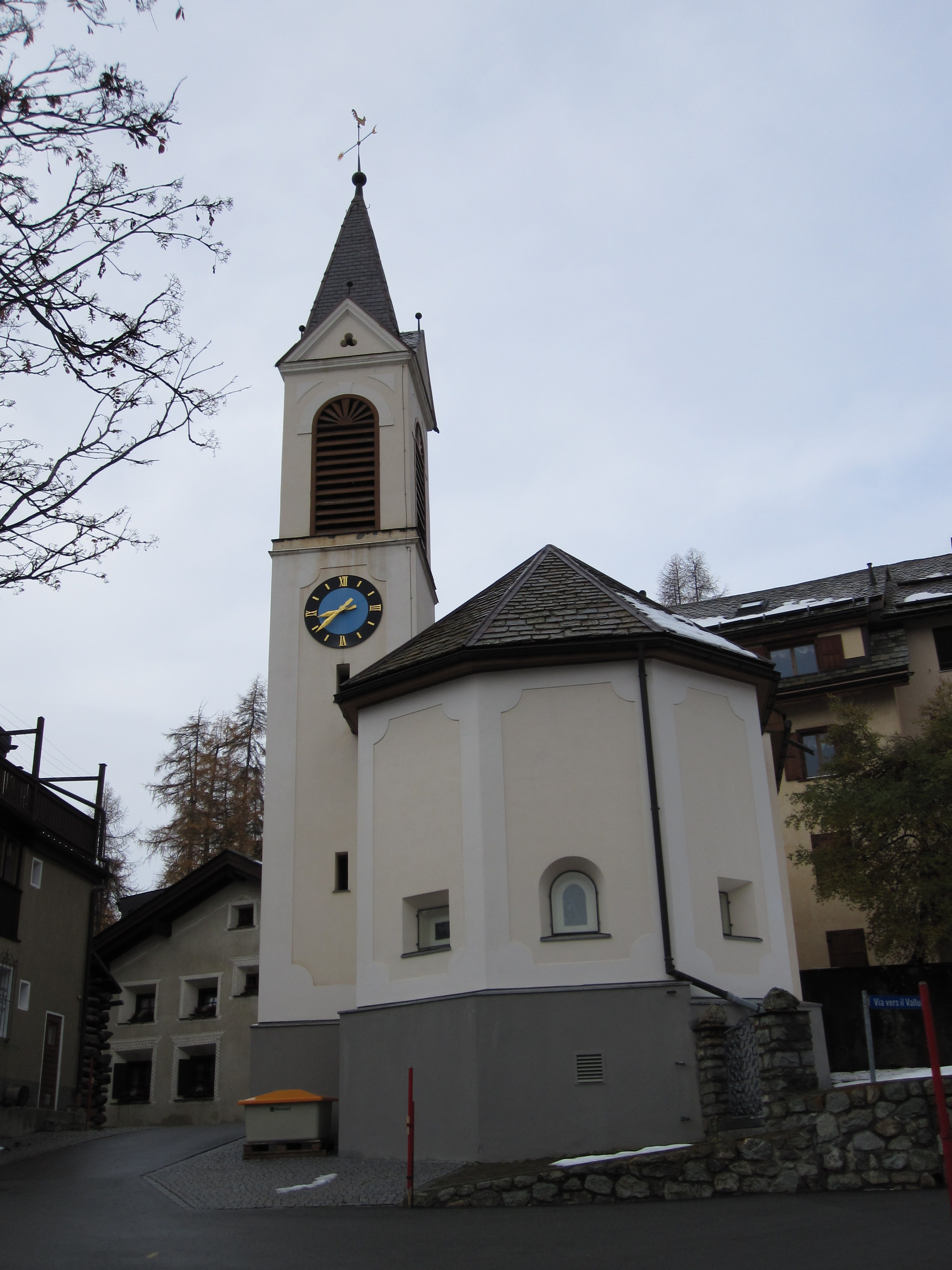

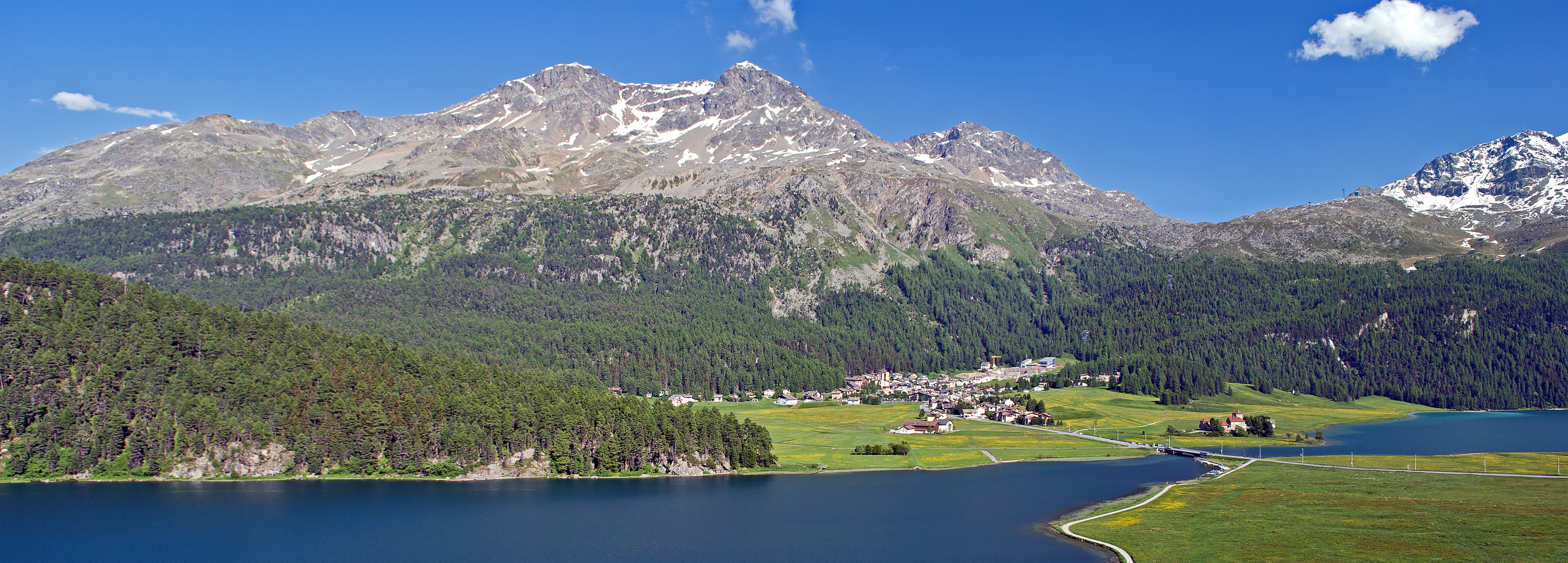
Champfèr Lake and surrounding landmarks
