= Ron Orp's Mail =

Ron Orp's Mail is an e-mail newsletter which is sent each weekday, from Monday to Friday, to subscribers in a dozen cities in Europe and the Americas.

Romano Strebel and Christian Klinner started Ron Orp's Mail in 2004 in Zurich, Switzerland. Initially it covered only Zurich, with news about the city’s cultural, gastronomic and party offerings, and also tips concerning music, media, reading and TV. Trends and new projects from the city as well as from around the globe are covered. The public market place is another important element of the newsletter. There inserts are published which have previously been advertised on the affiliated homepage.

The newsletter is nominally published by Ron Orp, but he is never seen and there is disagreement as to whether he exists or is a marketing gimmick.

== History ==
2004: The first issue of Ron Orp’s Mail is sent to 100 subscribers in Zurich on April 29, 2004. Within nine months, subscriptions reach 1000.

2005–2006: In December 2006, subscriptions reach 13,500. At that time, all content for the newsletter is compiled by only three people on a voluntary basis.

2007: Website and newsletter undergo a redesign. Additionally, the newsletter expands to Vienna, Basel, Bern, Lucerne, and Winterthur. In December 2007, subscriptions reach 25,000.

2008: The number of subscribers continues to rise and reaches 41,000 by December 2008. More than 20 people now work for Ron Orp’s Mail in the various cities. Expansion to St. Gallen and also New York City, Berlin and Munich. A weekly English-language version is also launched in Zurich (appears every Thursday).

2009: Website and newsletter undergo a second redesign. The number of subscribers reaches a new peak of 63,000.

2010: Ron Orp expands further, to French-speaking Switzerland (Geneva), Brazil (Brasília) and the UK (London). Ron Orp Zurich launches a digital magazine for the city called Ron Orp’s Magazine and an iPhone app. In December 2010, Ron Orp is awarded the title Digital Marketer of the Year by IAB Switzerland. Subscriber numbers: 100,000 (December 2010).

== Sources ==
- Amy Wong, "Ron Orp shines a rosier light on Langstrasse", World Radio Switzerland, 13 November 2009 (with audio)
