= Johannes Baur =

Austrian businessman

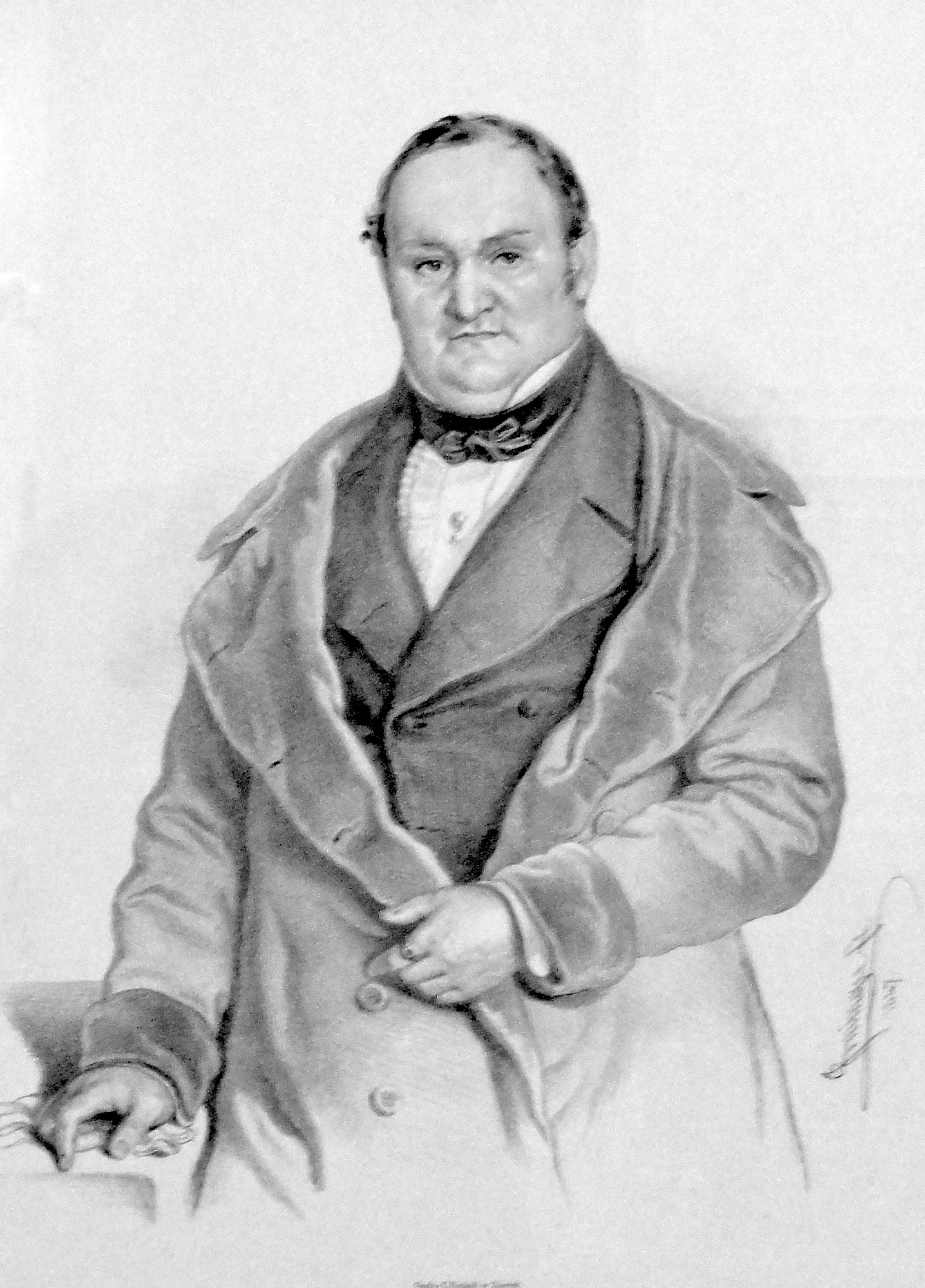
- Born: 13 December 1795; Götzis, Austria
- Died: 24 November 1865 (aged 69); Zürich, Switzerland
- Occupation: Businessman
- Known for: Opening first hotel in Zurich, Switzerland
- Spouse: Anna Knechtli

Johannes Baur (13 December 1795 – 24 November 1865) was an Austrian-born Swiss businessman, hotelier and tourism pioneer primarily active in Zürich, Switzerland. In 1838, he opened the first hotel in the city, Baur en Ville, which still operates at Paradeplatz. He is also namesake of Baur au Lac, which he founded shortly after, in 1844.

== Early life and career ==
Baur was born in Götzis, in the Austrian state of Vorarlberg, in 1795. His father, Johannes, was a customs officer and innkeeper.

A journeyman baker in his early years, Baur left Austria in the mid-1820s and emigrated to Zürich, via Rheinau, initially running the Zum Kirschbaum in Marktgasse, opposite the confectioner David Sprüngli, co-founder of Lindt & Sprüngli.

In 1836, Baur bought the building in Zürich which had previously served as a parsonage and opened Café Baur right next to the city's most important post office. Together with his wife, Anna Knechtli, Baur converted the house into a hotel between 1836 and 1838 according to plans by architect Daniel Pfister, and, on 24 December 1838, opened Baur en Ville as the city's first hotel. 140 beds and stables for 36 to 40 horses were available at the time.

Baur en Ville should not be confused with Baur au Lac, on Lake Zürich, which was also built by Baur in 1844.

After Baur's death, Heinrich Brunner took over the hotel, and in 1899 sold it to the property speculator Jakob Lassmann from Istanbul. In 1899, the architects Alfred Chiodera and Theophil Tschudy approved a reconstruction and extension project in the French Renaissance style, but it was not carried out. Lassmann's speculations led to financial ruin and the hotel was sold to Jakob Schwarz.

== Personal life ==
In 1826, Baur married Anna Knechtli, with whom he had at least one child;

- Theodor Baur (14 January 1828 – 22 August 1904); married firstly to Christiane Missfeld of Friedrichsort; secondly to Susanne Attinger, a daughter of Johannes Attinger, innkeeper in Dübendorf. His daughter Emmy Baur married Carl Kracht, of the hotelier family that owned Excelsior Hotel Ernst in Cologne, Germany. Baur au Lac today remains owned by the Kracht family.

In 1859, both Johannes and Theodor were made honorary citizens of Zürich, in recognition of their improvements of the architectural notability of the city. Baur died in Zürich on 24 November 1865, aged 69. His wife survived him by two years.
