= Mandarin Oriental Savoy =

Oldest Grand Hotel in Zürich

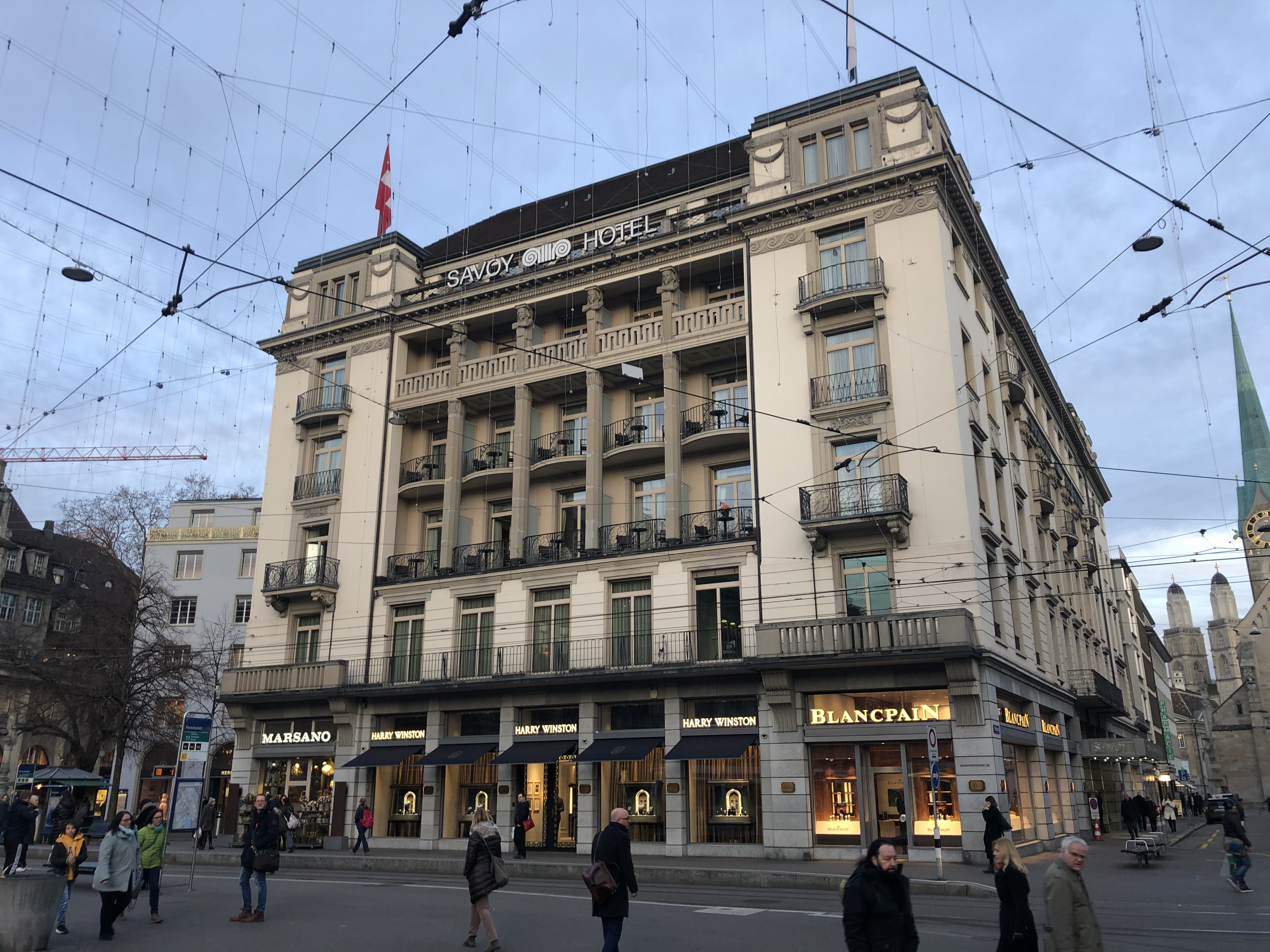
- Baur en Ville, 2020
- Interactive map of the Mandarin Oriental Savoy area

General information
- Location: Zürich, Switzerland, Paradeplatz / Poststrasse 12, CH-8001
- Coordinates: 47.369844°N 8.539500°E
- Opening: 1838 (188 years ago)

Technical details
- Floor count: 6

Design and construction
- Architects: Daniel Pfister (1838); Chiodera & Tschudy (1899); Pfleghard & Haefeli (1907); Fässler & Partner (1990s); Tristan Auer (2023)

Other information
- Number of rooms: 44
- Number of suites: 36
- Number of restaurants: 2
- Number of bars: 1

Website
- www.mandarinoriental.com/en/zurich/savoy

Mandarin Oriental Savoy (formerly known as Baur en Ville and Savoy Baur en Ville) is the oldest Grand Hotel in Zurich, Switzerland. Founded in 1838 by Johannes Baur it is located on Poststrasse on the Eastern side of Paradeplatz. It has hosted many internationally acclaimed visitors such as Franz Liszt, General Dufour and former U.S. president Bill Clinton.

For many decades the hotel was owned by Credit Suisse. In 2022, the hotel was temporarily closed, in order to start renovations. In October of 2022, Credit Suisse announced that they want to sell the property. Due to the Acquisition of Credit Suisse by UBS, UBS took ownership of the hotel in March of 2023. It has officially reopened in December of 2023. It is currently managed by the Mandarin Oriental Hotel Group and offers 44 rooms and 36 suites, Savoy Brasserie & Bar (French inspired), 1838 (rooftop), a ballroom, a historic guild room as well as the 1-star gourmet restaurant Orsini which is led by Italian chef Antonio Guida.

== History ==
Johannes Baur, originally a journeyman baker from Vorarlberg, Austria, immigrated to Zürich in the 1820s. He initially ran the Zum Kirschbaum in Marktgasse, opposite the confectioner David Sprüngli, co-founder of Lindt & Sprüngli.

In 1836, Baur bought the building in Zürich which had previously served as a parsonage and opened Café Baur right next to the city's most important post office. Together with his wife, Anna Knechtli, Baur converted the house into a hotel between 1836 and 1838 according to plans by architect Daniel Pfister, and, on 24 December 1838, opened Baur en Ville as the city's first hotel. 140 beds and stables for 36-40 horses were available at the time.

The chronicle of 1845 contains the names of various notable people of the time who stayed at the Hotel Baur en Ville, such as Friedrich Wilhelm von Bismarck and Anselm von Rothschild, Felix Mendelssohn and Franz Liszt.

From 1877 to 1878, the house and the restaurant Orsini were rebuilt. After Baur's death, Heinrich Brunner took over the hotel and in 1899 sold it to the property speculator Jakob Lassmann from Istanbul. In 1899, the architects Alfred Chiodera and Theophil Tschudy approved a reconstruction and extension project in the French Renaissance style, but it was not carried out. Lassmann's speculations led to financial ruin and the hotel was sold to Jakob Schwarz.

In 1907, under Schwarz, the conversion and extension was commissioned from the architects Pfleghard & Haefeli and 170 rooms were reopened on 13 June 1908. Since then, the hotel has borne the name Savoy.

Since 1923, the hotel has been home to the United Guilds of Gerwe and Schumachern, and on 28 November 1924 the United Guilds celebrated their first meal in the hotel. Since 1923, the Savoy Club, founded in 1890 by Zürich returnees, has met in the hotel.

From 1975 to 1978, the hotel was closed due to urgently needed renovation work. It was reopened on 31 March 1978.

In the 1990s, the architects Fässler & Partner carried out various conversion work during ongoing operations, such as the renovation of the facade and roof in 1997, the conversion of 90 guest bathrooms and the redesign of the Orsini restaurant in 1998, the redesign of the banqueting and guild hall in 1999 and the redesign of 30 guest rooms and replacement of the canopy at the main entrance in 2000.

Between 1985 and 2015, Christina and Manfred Hörger managed the hotel. Manfred died in 2015, and in 2017 Christina handed over the management to Werner Knechtli.

The terrace was reopened in 2018 as an extension of the Savoy Bar. Today the hotel has 104 rooms and suites and 170 employees.

Baur en Ville should not be confused with Baur au Lac, on Lake Zürich, which was also built by Baur in 1844.

== Architecture and construction ==
From 1836 to 1838, the master builder and architect Daniel Pfister erected a regular, block-like structure, divided by Ionic columns and pilasters with Ionic capitals. During the 1907 conversion, the hotel was extended by two storeys, preserving the architectural style of the original building. Instead of the formerly continuous loggia, all the rooms behind the main façade were fitted with verandas and the pillars on the ground floor were narrowed down. The new floors were joined together by pillars with plant capitals that spanned several storeys. The top floor is distinguished by a meandering stone railing and pharaoh figures supporting the beams.

In the 1970s, the building had to be completely demolished in accordance with fire protection guidelines, but also for reasons of comfort; conversion was not possible. At the same time, however, the street scene, consisting of the Tiefenhofhäusern, the Kreditanstalt and the Hotel Savoy Baur en Ville on Paradeplatz, was to be retained. The contract for the construction was awarded to Karl Steiner AG, which removed the façade step by step, erected a new building and then rebuilt the historic façade. Inside, the hotel is therefore built in the style of the 1970s, while from the outside it still shows the historic facade.

== Gallery ==
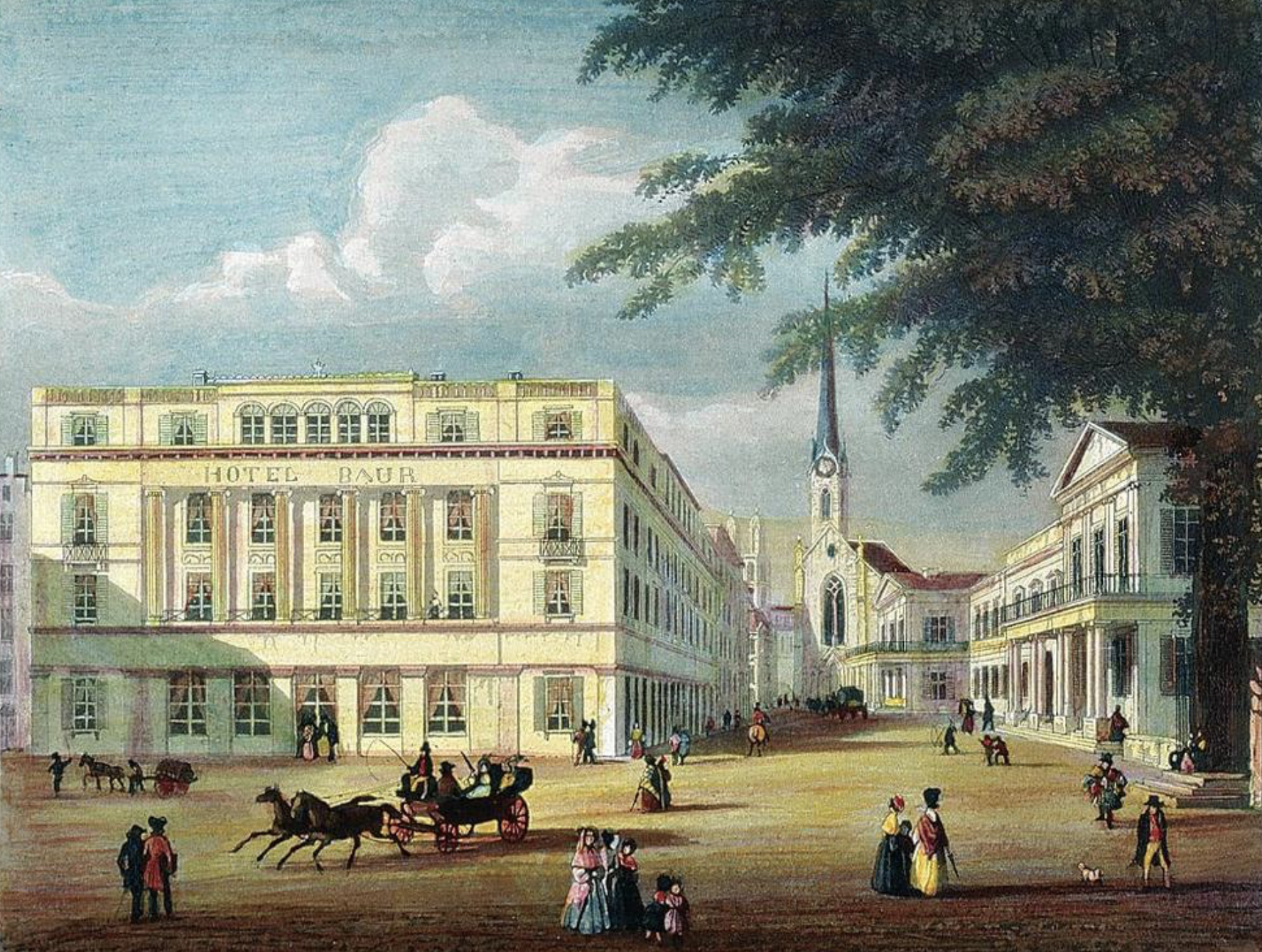
1840

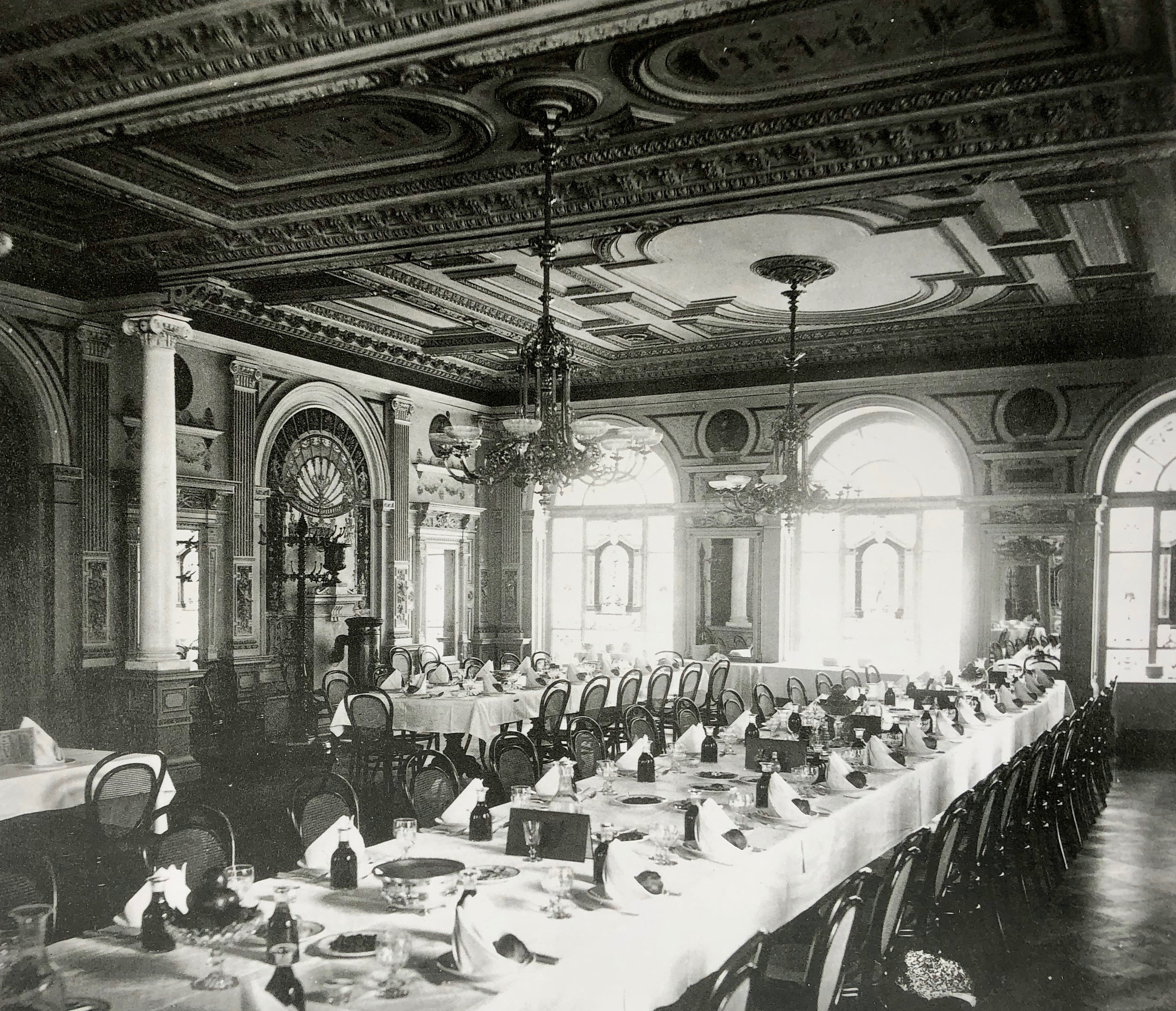
Dining room, 1895

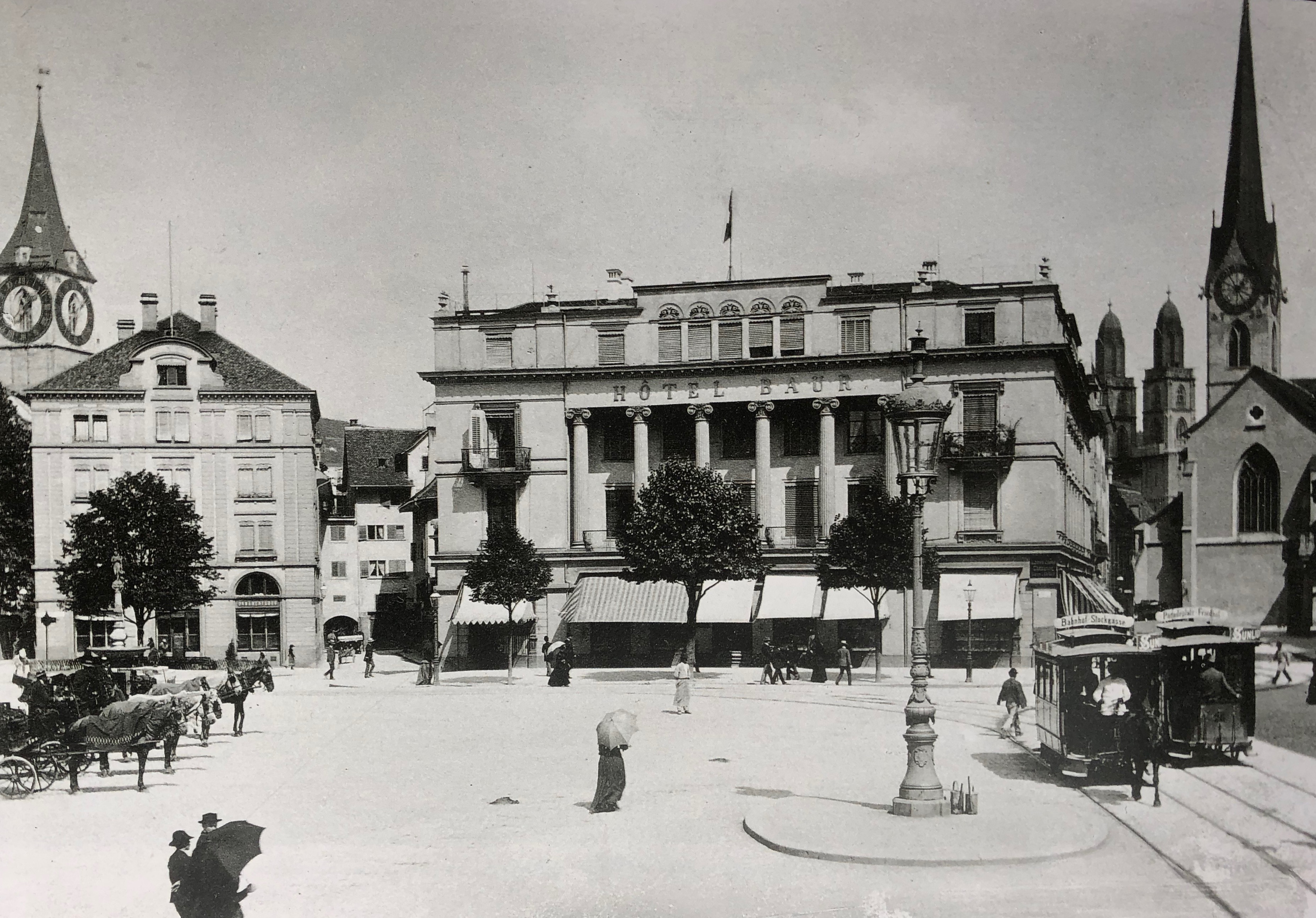
1897

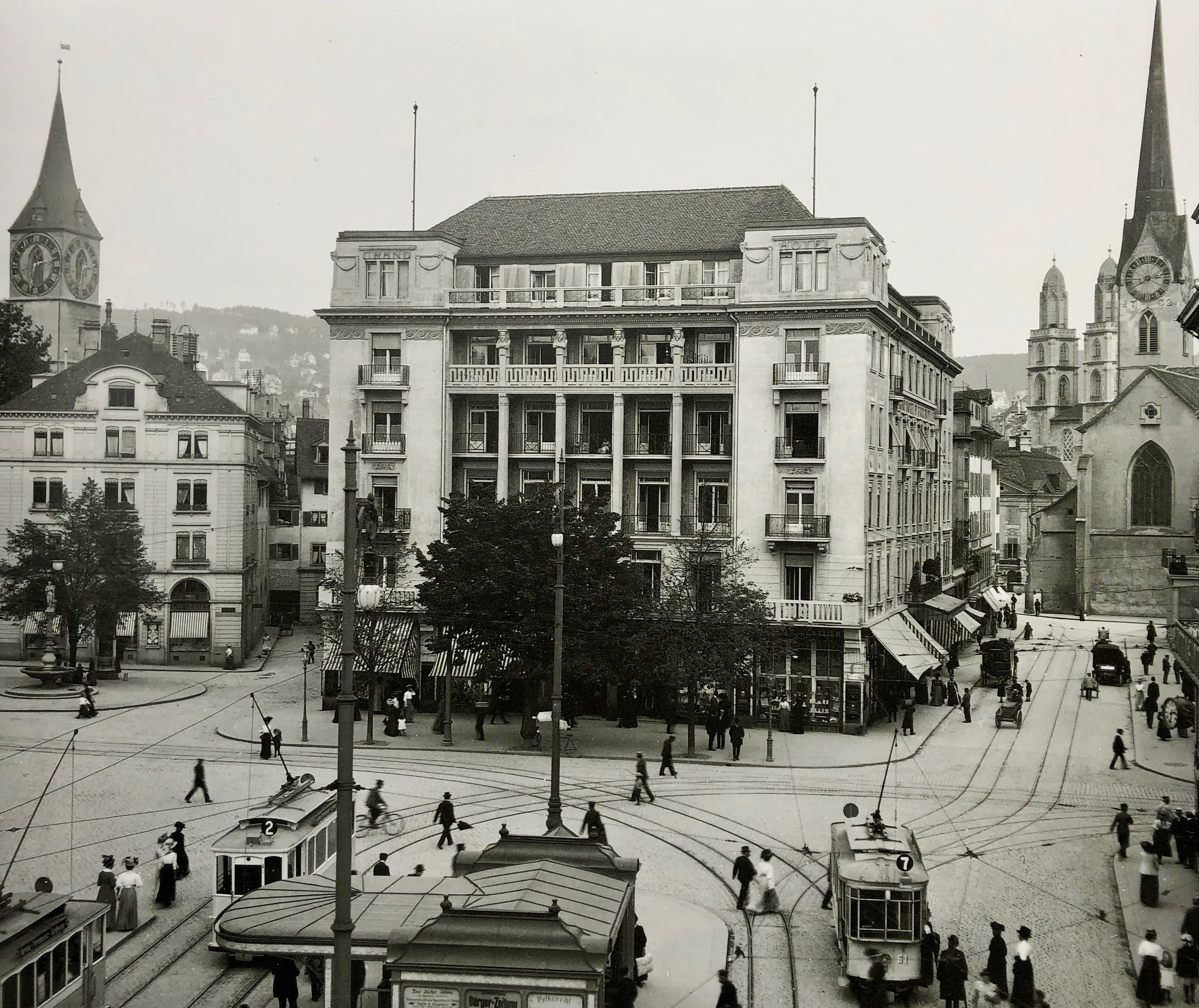
Post-expansion, 1910

== See also ==
- List of hotels in Switzerland
- Tourism in Switzerland

== Literature ==
- Walter Baumann: Zu Gast im alten Zürich. München 1992, ISBN 3-88034-594-5
- Hans Schulthess: Savoy Hotel Baur en Ville Zürich 1838–1938. Schulthess, Zürich 1938.
