= Sprüngli =

Sprüngli may refer to:

- Confiserie Sprüngli, a Swiss luxury confectionery manufacturer known for its "Luxemburgerli" macaroons
- Lindt & Sprüngli AG, more commonly known as Lindt, a Swiss chocolate and confectionery company
- Anna Rüling, the pseudonym of Theodora "Theo" Anna Sprüngli (1880 – 1953), German journalist and lesbian activist
