= The Saints Rugby School =

The Saints Rugby School Zug
- Founded: 2006
- Location: Zug, Switzerland
- Ground: Unteraegeri
- Coach: (England) Ian Fowler (Calabria) Elio Gallo

The Saints Rugby School is a Swiss rugby union team based in Zug and is the junior team of Rugby Club Zug It was formed in March 2006 and is now one of the top junior rugby teams in Switzerland.

== History ==
The Saints were formed in September 2005 by Rugby Club Zug member and school teacher Elio Gallo and his former students Michael Schiavo and Alois Dober. Many players were from the local St. Michaels school, while others were from the local area and the international community in Zug. The team was then accepted into the North Switzerland Rugby Federation

The team played their first game against Zurich International School's Junior Varsity team in October 2005 and then played games against Zurich International School's team and Wurenlos before the end of 2005.

Their first coach Chris Wilkins left the team in early 2006 following differences with the club and the direction it was taking. Ian Fowler became the new coach of The Saints.

The Saints hosted their first tournament in October 2006 in Unterageri. They won their first game against ZIS' Junior Varsity side, and beat three other teams en route to the final. They lost to ZIS in the final 7–5.

In October 2007, the Saints travelled to Bellinzona where they won a Swiss Rugby Federation Tournament for the first time, beating Milano in the final 17–0, conceding no tries en route to the final.

== Players ==
Some players such as Jean Omaboe and Rob McCaskill have played for the club since its inception and are the club's longest serving players. Alois Dober, Nick Cutler and Antoine Keoltgen have represented Switzerland and Victor Agov has represented Albania at youth level

| Name | Years active | Pos |
|---|---|---|
| (Bulgaria) Victor Agov | (2005 - ) | Flanker |
| (Turkey) Raphael Brennickmeijer | (2005 - 2008) | Winger |
| (South Africa) Nick Cutler | (2007 - 2009) | Hookers |
| (United States) Alois Dober | (2005 - 2008) | Flanker |
| (Italy) Federico Guidetti | (2007 - 2008) | Fly-Half |
| (Belgium) Justin Henskens | (2005 - 2008) | Winger |
| (Japan) Seiji Nishio | (2005 - 2005) | Winger |
| (France) Antoine Koeltgen | (2005 - 2008) | Prop |
| (France) Jean Koeltgen | (2005 - ) | Centre |
| (England) Rob McCaskill | (2005 - 2008) | Fly-Half |
| (Republic of Ireland) Eugene O'Sullivan | (2007 - ) | Scrum-Half |
| (Switzerland) Jean Omaboe | (2005 - 2008) | No. 8 |
| (Poland) Miłosz Sakowski | (2007 - ) | Lock |
| (Switzerland) Michael Schiavo | (2005 - 2008) | Flanker |
| (Switzerland) Lukas Staub | (2007 - ) | Lock |
| (England) Alfred Stevenson | (2006 - 2008) | Centre |

== Notable Past Players ==
| Name | Years active | Pos |
|---|---|---|
| (England) Dan Bell | (2005 - 2006) | Lock |
| (England) Steve McCaskill | (2005 - 2007) | Centre |
| (Republic of Ireland) Karl O'Sullivan | (2005 - 2006) | Winger |
