= Hofbauer =

Hofbauer (or Hoffbauer) is a German surname. Notable people with the surname include:

== Hofbauer ==
- Clement Mary Hofbauer (Saint Clement, 1751–1820), patron saint of Vienna
- Dominik Hofbauer (born 1990), Austrian footballer
- Ernst Hofbauer (1925–1984), Austrian film director
- Gert Hofbauer (1937–2017), Austrian conductor and trumpeter
- Jil Y. Creek, also known as Ilona Hofbauer, Austrian guitarist
- Josef Hofbauer (1901–1968), Austrian footballer
- Kevin Hofbauer, Australian actor
- Matthias Hofbauer (born 1981), Swiss floorball player
- Michael Hofbauer (1964–2013), Czech film actor
- Otto Hofbauer (born 1932), Austrian footballer
- Steve Hofbauer, American politician
- Trevor Hofbauer (born 1992), Canadian long-distance runner

== Hoffbauer ==
- Charles Hoffbauer (1875–1957), French artist

== See also ==
- Hofbauer cell, type of cell found in the human female placenta
- Hofbauer Österreich, Viennese chocolatier founded in 1882, now owned by Lindt & Sprüngli
- Hofbauer Treppen, staircase maker in Abensberg, Germany, operating since 1706
