= Kilchberg, Zurich =

Municipality in Zurich, Switzerland

Kilchberg
- Municipality
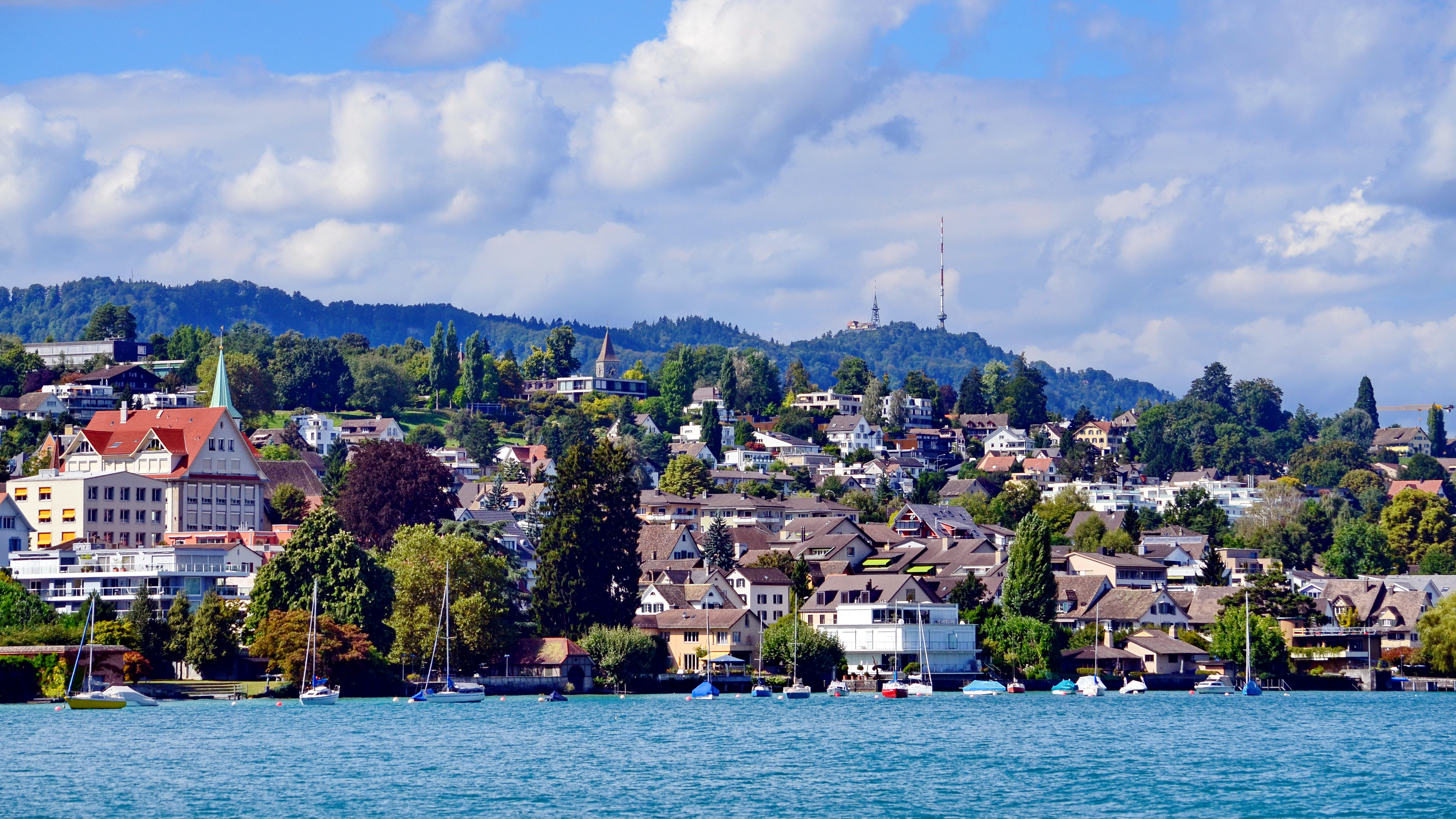

- Flag Coat of arms
- Location of Kilchberg
- Location within Switzerland Location within Canton of Zürich
- Coordinates: 47°19′N 8°33′E
- Country: Switzerland
- Canton: Zürich
- District: Horgen

Government
  - Mayor: Phyllis Scholl

Area
  - Total: 2.58 km^{2} (1.00 sq mi)
- Elevation: 510 m (1,670 ft)

Population (December 2020)
  - Total: 9,207
  - Density: 3,570/km^{2} (9,240/sq mi)
- Time zone: UTC+01:00 (CET)
  - Summer (DST): UTC+02:00 (CEST)
- Postal code: 8802
- SFOS number: 135
- ISO 3166 code: CH-ZH
- Surrounded by: Adliswil, Küsnacht, Rüschlikon, Zollikon, Zürich
- Twin towns: Kilchberg bei Tübingen (Germany)
- Website: www.kilchberg.ch

Kilchberg (High Alemannic: Chilchbèèrg) is a municipality in the district of Horgen in the canton of Zürich in Switzerland. Kilchberg is the site of a regional cemetery.

== History ==
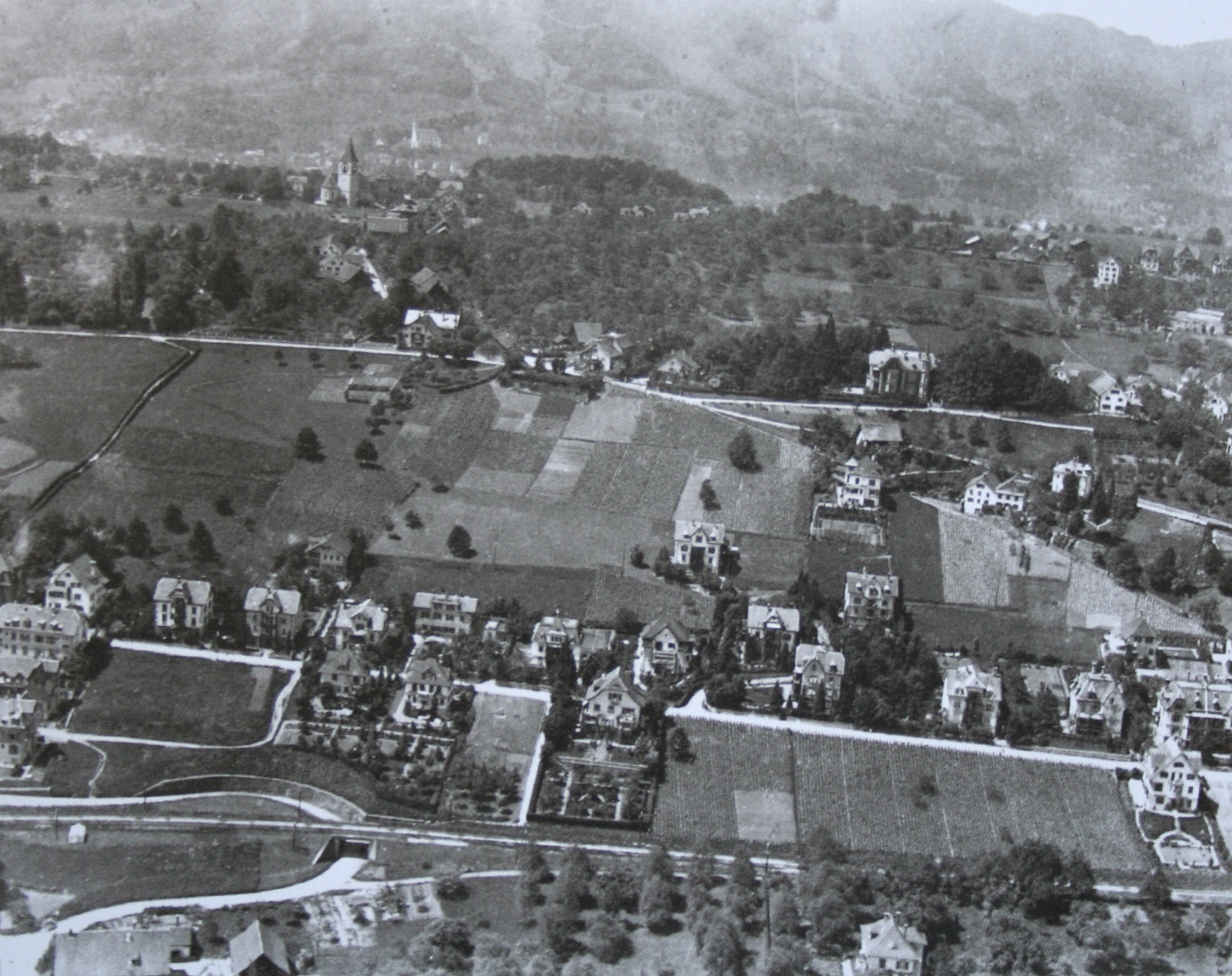
Aerial view by Walter Mittelholzer (1920)

Kilchberg is first mentioned in 1248 as Hilchberch. In 1250 it was mentioned as Kilchperch. It grew out of the medieval village of Bendlikon (first mentioned in 1250 as Benklinkon) where Kilchberg was just a section of the village. Its coat of arms is "Azure a Quatrefoil Argent seeded Or."

== Geography ==
Kilchberg has an area of 2.6 km^{2} (1.0 sq mi). Of this area, 26.5% is used for agricultural purposes, while 1.9% is forested. Of the rest of the land, 71.2% is settled (buildings or roads) and the remainder (0.4%) is non-productive (rivers, glaciers or mountains). In 1996 housing and buildings made up 58.1% of the total area, while transportation infrastructure made up the rest (13.2%). As of 2007 74.9% of the total municipal area was undergoing some type of construction.

== Demographics ==
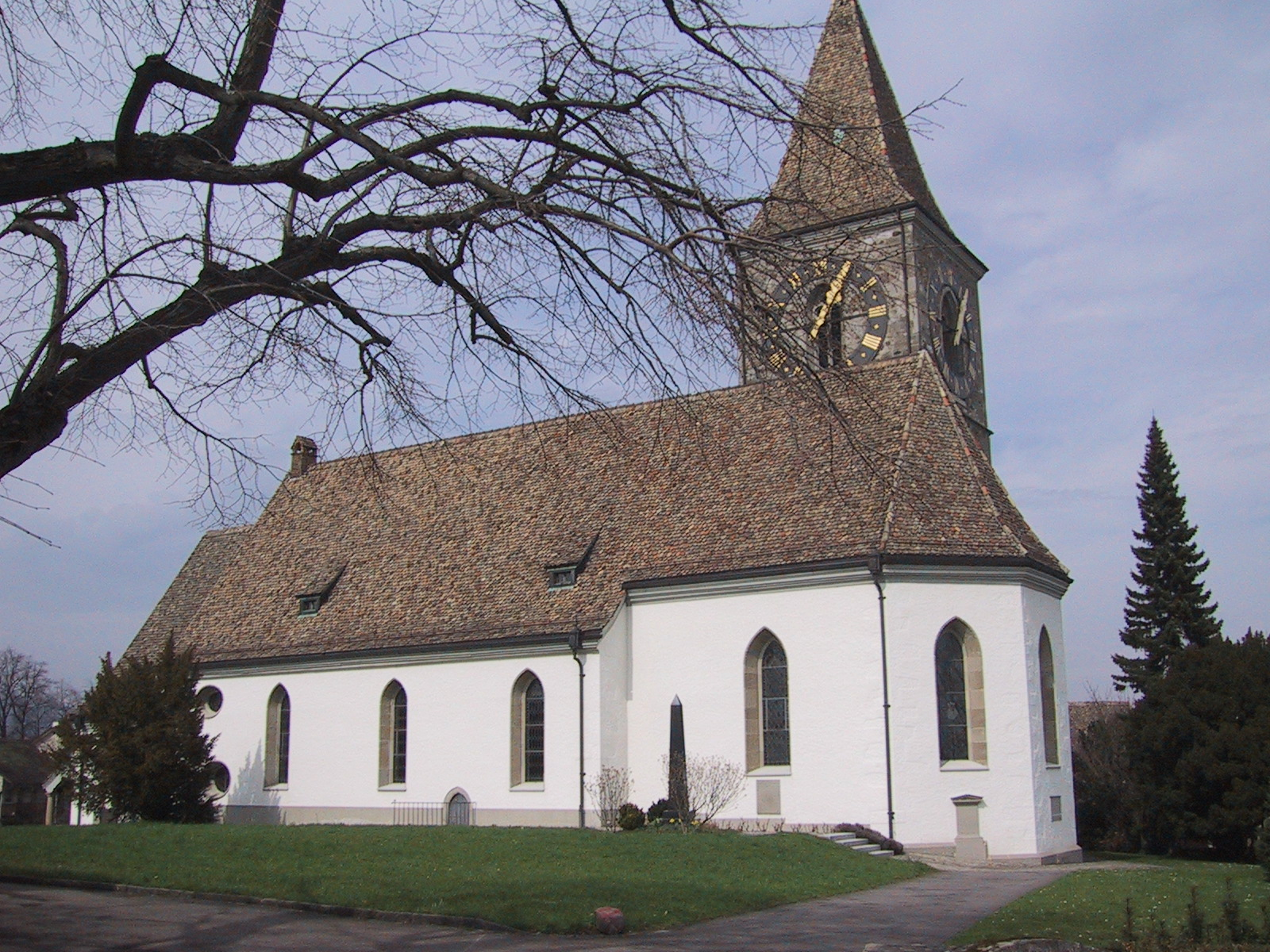
Church of Kilchberg

Kilchberg has a population (as of 31 December 2020) of 9,207. As of 2007, 21.2% of the population was made up of foreign nationals. As of 2008 the gender distribution of the population was 48.1% male and 51.9% female. Over the last 10 years the population has grown at a rate of 1.8% per annum. Most of the population (as of 2000) speaks German (84.0%), with English being second most common (4.1%) and Italian being third (2.8%).

In the 2007 national election the most popular party was the SVP which received 30.8% of the vote. The next three most popular parties were the FDP (27.4%), the SPS (12.5%) and the CSP (10.2%).

The age distribution of the population (as of 2000) is composed of 17.2% children and teenagers (0–19 years old), 63% adults (20–64 years old), and 19.8% seniors (over 64 years old). About 84.7% of the population (between age 25–64) have completed either non-mandatory upper secondary education or additional higher education (either university or a Fachhochschule). There are 3,512 households in Kilchberg.

As of 2008 there were 1928 Catholics and 2786 Protestants in Kilchberg. In the 2000 census, religion was broken down into several smaller categories. From the census, 44.3% were some type of Protestant, with 42.7% belonging to the Swiss Reformed Church and 1.6% belonging to other Protestant churches. 28.1% of the population were Catholic. Of the rest of the population, 0% were Muslim, 6.3% belonged to another religion (not listed), 3.3% did not give a religion, and 17.3% were atheist or agnostic.

The historical population is given in the following table:

Year	Population
1467	43 households
1634	286
1671	515
1722	617
1836	958
1850	1,141
1900	1,951
1950	5,474
1970	7,546
1990	7,081
2000	7,197
2010	7,454
2020	9,189

== Industry ==
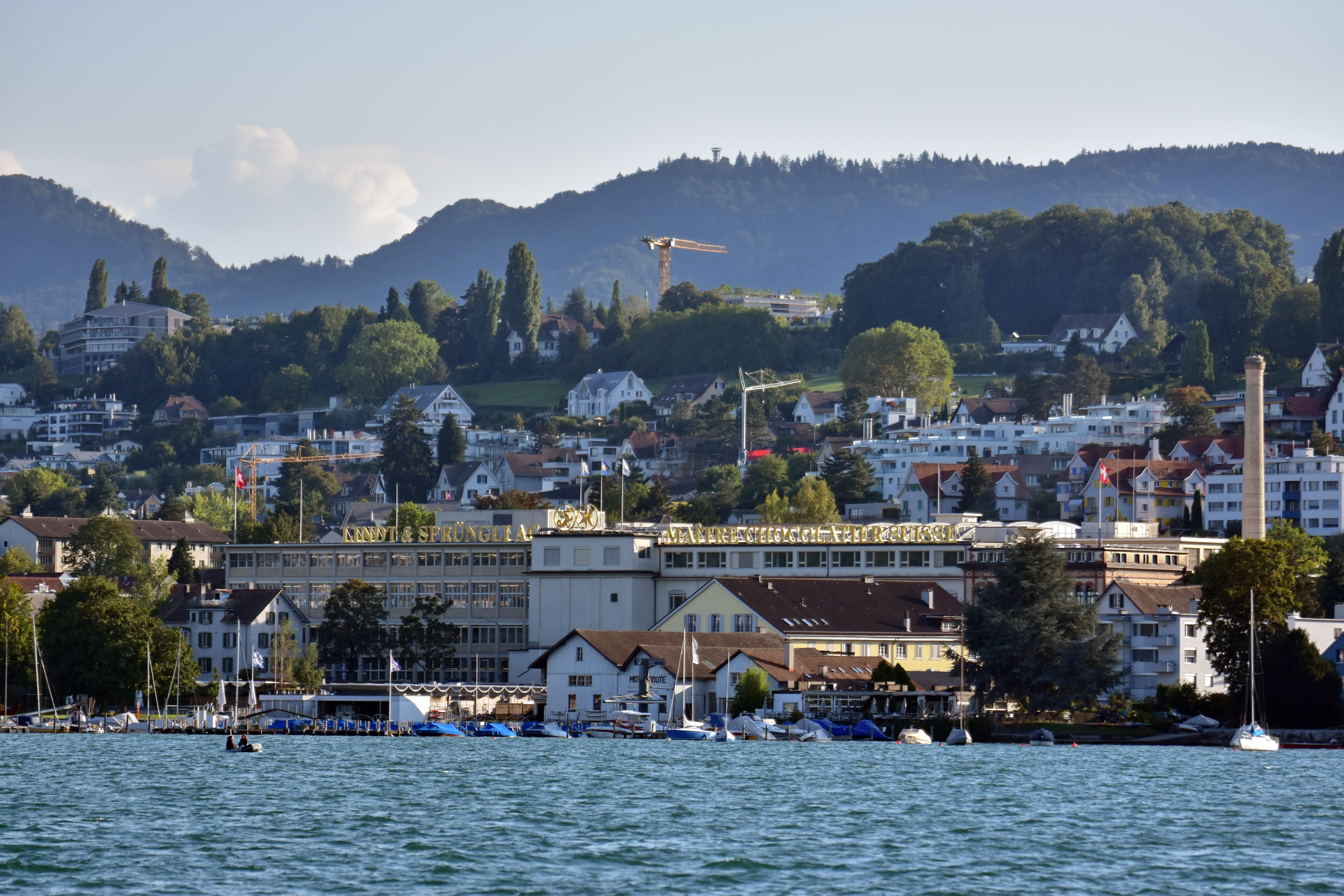
Lindt & Sprüngli Kilchberg

Kilchberg is home to the corporate headquarters of the confectioner Lindt & Sprüngli with next to it the Lindt Museum.

Kilchberg has an unemployment rate of 1.64%. As of 2005, there were 118 people employed in the primary economic sector and about 11 businesses involved in this sector. 1479 people are employed in the secondary sector and there are 48 businesses in this sector. 1983 people are employed in the tertiary sector, with 306 businesses in this sector. As of 2007 65% of the working population were employed full-time, and 35% were employed part-time. Kilchberg is also the location of the private hospital Krankenhaus Sanitas.

== Transport ==
Kilchberg railway station is located on the Lake Zurich left bank railway and a stop on Zurich S-Bahn lines S8 and S24 (4 trains per hour).

Kilchberg is connected to Zurich with VBZ bus line 161. Bus line 162 connects Kilchberg See Spital with Kilchberg railway station and bus line 163 runs between Kilchberg, Obere Hornhalde and Kilchberg railway station.

Tourist boat trips, run by the Zürichsee-Schifffahrtsgesellschaft, also sail from here to (Bendlikon) Zurich and Rapperswil.

== Education ==
=== Public schools ===
The public schools (primary and lower secondary school) are supervised by the commune's school board. The board consists of nine elected members.

Public school buildings:

- Brunnenmoos A-C
- Alte Landstrasse
- Gemeindehaus
- Dorfstrasse

=== Other private schools ===
The Zürich International School (ZIS), an American curriculum private international school, has two campuses in Kilchberg: Early Childhood Center and Middle School Kilchberg. The American International School of Zurich was previously located in Kilchberg. The bureau for elementary school (Volksschulamt) of the canton of Zürich does not approve ZIS for its lower and upper secondary education (Sekundarstufe I aka Sekundarschule, and Sekundarstufe II aka Mittelschule). Therefore, its upper secondary school is not approved by the Swiss Federation, neither.

== International relations ==
Kilchberg, Zürich is twinned with:

- Kilchberg district of Tübingen, Germany (since 1956)

== Notable people ==
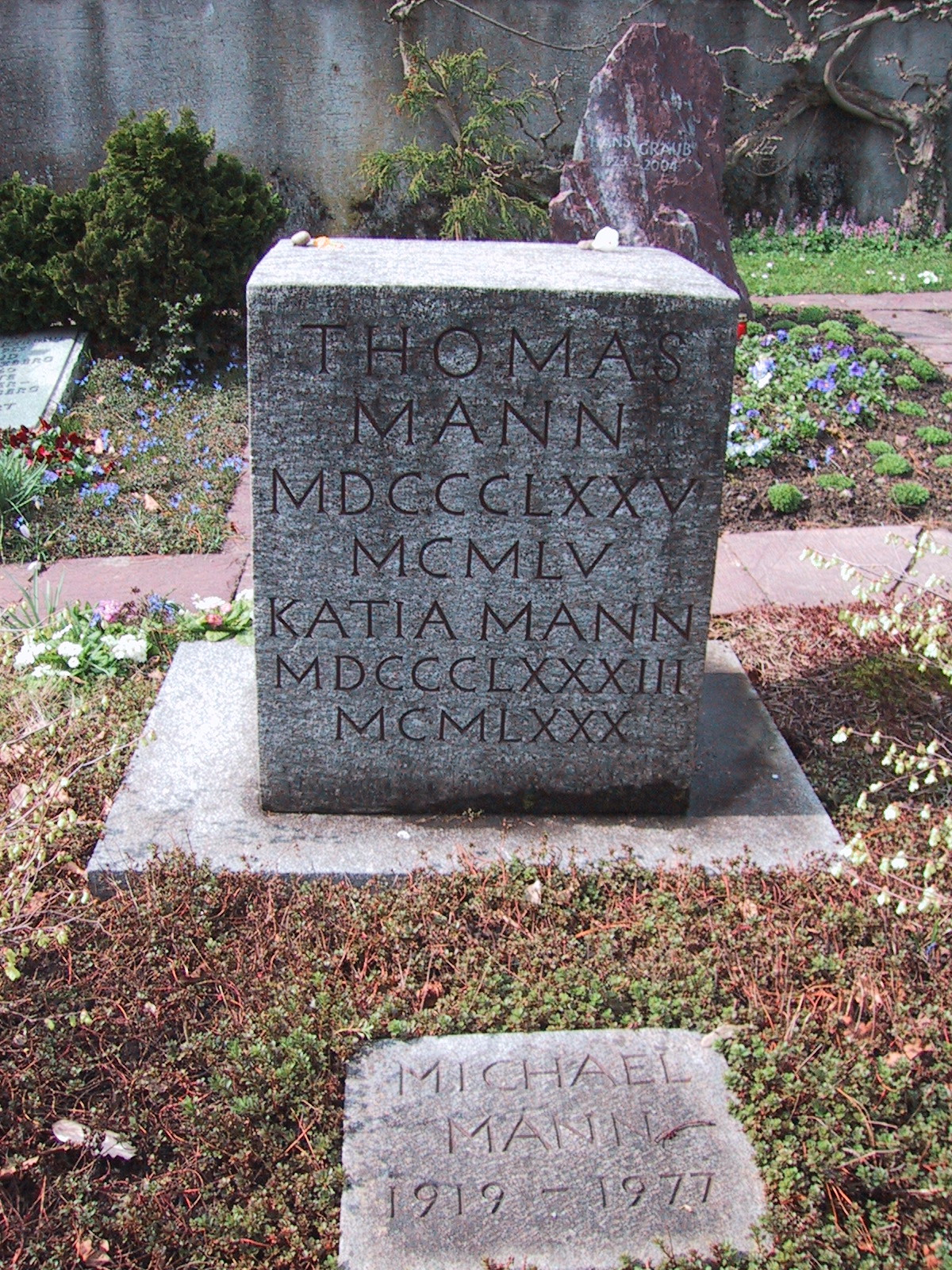
Thomas Mann's grave in Kilchberg

- German author Thomas Mann made his home in Kilchberg when he returned to Europe after World War II, and is buried there.
- Swiss author Conrad Ferdinand Meyer was born in Zürich (October 11, 1825) and died in Kilchberg (November 28, 1898). In his honour, there is a C. F. Meyer museum in Kilchberg.
- Swiss-German chocolatier David Sprüngli-Schwartz and his son were born in Zürich but owned factories and died in Kilchberg. Their chocolate company, Lindt & Sprüngli, is more commonly known as Lindt.
- Indie musician and frontman of the English rock band Marriott, James Marriott, was born in Kilchberg but moved to Buckinghamshire in his childhood and both of his parents being from the UK.
- Carl Wilhelm von Nägeli (1817–1891), Swiss botanist who corresponded unproductively with Gregor Mendel, was born in Kilchberg.
