= Paradeplatz tram stop =

Tram stop in Zurich, Switzerland

Paradeplatz
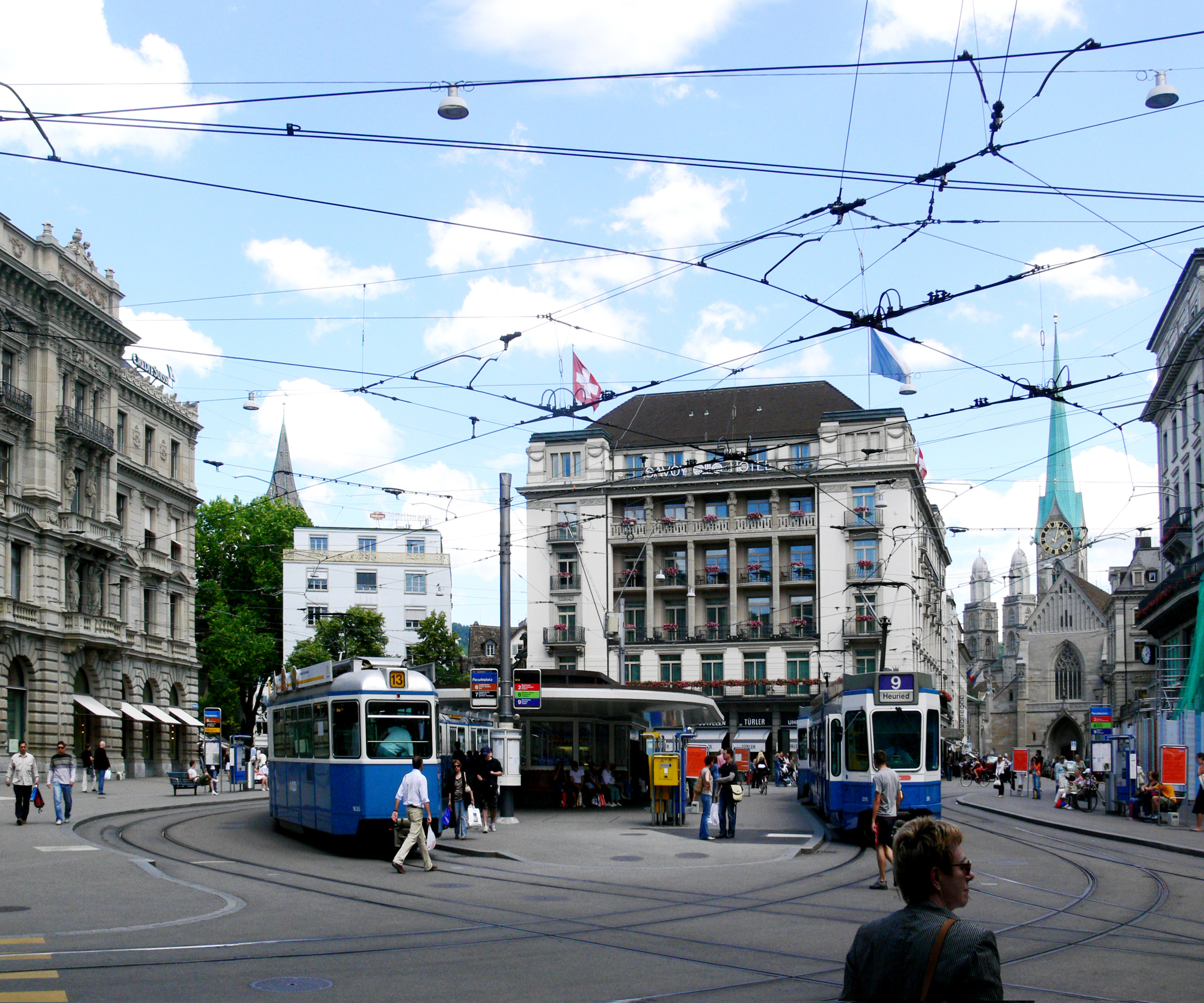
- Paradeplatz in 2007, looking east towards Hotel Baur en Ville

General information
- Location: Paradeplatz, Zurich; Switzerland
- Coordinates: 47.36971°N 8.53890°E
- System: Verkehrsbetriebe Zürich tram stop
- Owner: Verkehrsbetriebe Zürich
- Operator: Verkehrsbetriebe Zürich
- Tram routes: 6

Services
Preceding station	Zürich tramway network	Following station
Sihlstrasse towards Geissweid	2	Kantonalbank towards Klusplatz
Stockerstrasse towards Laubegg	5	Kantonalbank towards Zürich Stadelhofen
Stockerstrasse towards Wollishoferplatz	7	Rennweg towards Stettbach
Sihlstrasse towards Triemli	9	Kantonalbank towards Hirzenbach
Rennweg towards Zürich Hauptbahnhof	11	Kantonalbank towards Zürich Tiefenbrunnen
Stockerstrasse towards Albisgütli	13	Rennweg towards Zürich Hauptbahnhof
Location
- Location within Switzerland

Paradeplatz tram stop, located in Paradeplatz, Zurich, Switzerland, is one of the 487 tram stops on the Zurich tram network. It is one of the busiest transfer points, given its central position and location on the city's main street, Bahnhofstrasse. The stop is owned and maintained by Verkehrsbetriebe Zürich (VBZ), which operates Zurich's trams, buses and Polybahn and Rigiblick funiculars

The first horse-drawn trams circulated in 1882; the trams were electrified in 1896.

Trams were mentioned at Paradeplatz in 1888. Hermann Herter architects designed the stop's waiting shelter in 1928.

== Services ==
As of the December 2025 timetable change, the stop is served by six lines: 2, 5, 7, 9, 11 and 13.

- 2 and 9 to Stauffacher
- 7, 11 and 13 to Zürich Hauptbahnhof (main railway station) along the northern part of Bahnhofstrasse
- 2, 5, 9 and 11 to Bürkliplatz and Bellevueplatz along the southern part of Bahnhofstrasse
- 5, 7 and 13 to Zürich Enge railway station.

== See also ==
- Public transport in Zurich
