= American International School of Zurich =

Former school in Switzerland

The American International School of Zurich (AISZ) was an American international school located in the Spinnergut Villa of Kilchberg, Switzerland in Greater Zurich. Originally built in 1914, Villa Spinnergut was a former family home. Founded in 1963, it was an independent school until its 2001 merger with the International Primary School of Zurich to create the Zurich International School.

Founded in 1963 by a group of parents and educators, the American International School of Zurich, a secondary day school (grades 7–13), offered a broad college-preparatory curriculum in English to students from the international community of Zurich and the surrounding area. As an international school AISZ aimed to provide a sound education for its students both in academic achievement and personal growth, regardless of religion, race, nationality or sex. 90%+ of the graduating seniors entered universities and institutions of higher learning worldwide.

An academic program, centered on the traditional core disciplines, prepared the academically inclined student for university entrance. However, the school also offered courses and learning support services which addressed the needs of a student body diverse in educational background and ability.

AISZ also offered a variety of other activities, clubs, sports, and field trips.

AISZ was accredited by the New England Association of Schools and Colleges (NEASC) and by the European Council of International Schools (ECIS).

The AISZ campus is now used as the ZIS Middle School Kilchberg Campus.
