= Jil Y. Creek =

- Also known as: Ilona Hofbauer
- Born: Vienna, Austria
- Occupation(s): Guitarist, Writer
- Instrument: Guitar
- Website: www.jilycreek.com

Jil Y. Creek (artistic name) (born in Vienna) is an Austrian guitar virtuoso. Best known as author of the guitar workshops “Jil’s Jam” in German Gitarre & Bass Magazine (since June 2006), and the workbooks “Creative Guitar” (published 2008 by Tunesday Records, Berlin, Germany), "Jil's Pentatonik Workshop für E-Gitarre" (2012, same publisher) and "Arpeggio-Workbook für E-Gitarre" (2018, same publisher). Besides her instrumental project, Creek has worked with German gothic acts Umbra et Imago and Lacrimosa as well as with a Frank Zappa cover band called S.W.N.B., led by Austrian legend Wickerl Adam (founder of the Hallucination Company), amongst others.

== CD- and Videography ==
- Reckless “Radio-Active”
- Sanguis et Cinis: “Madrigal”
- Lacrimosa: “Lichtgestalt” from “Musikkurzfilme – The Video Collection”
