= Baur au Lac =

Luxury hotel in Switzerland

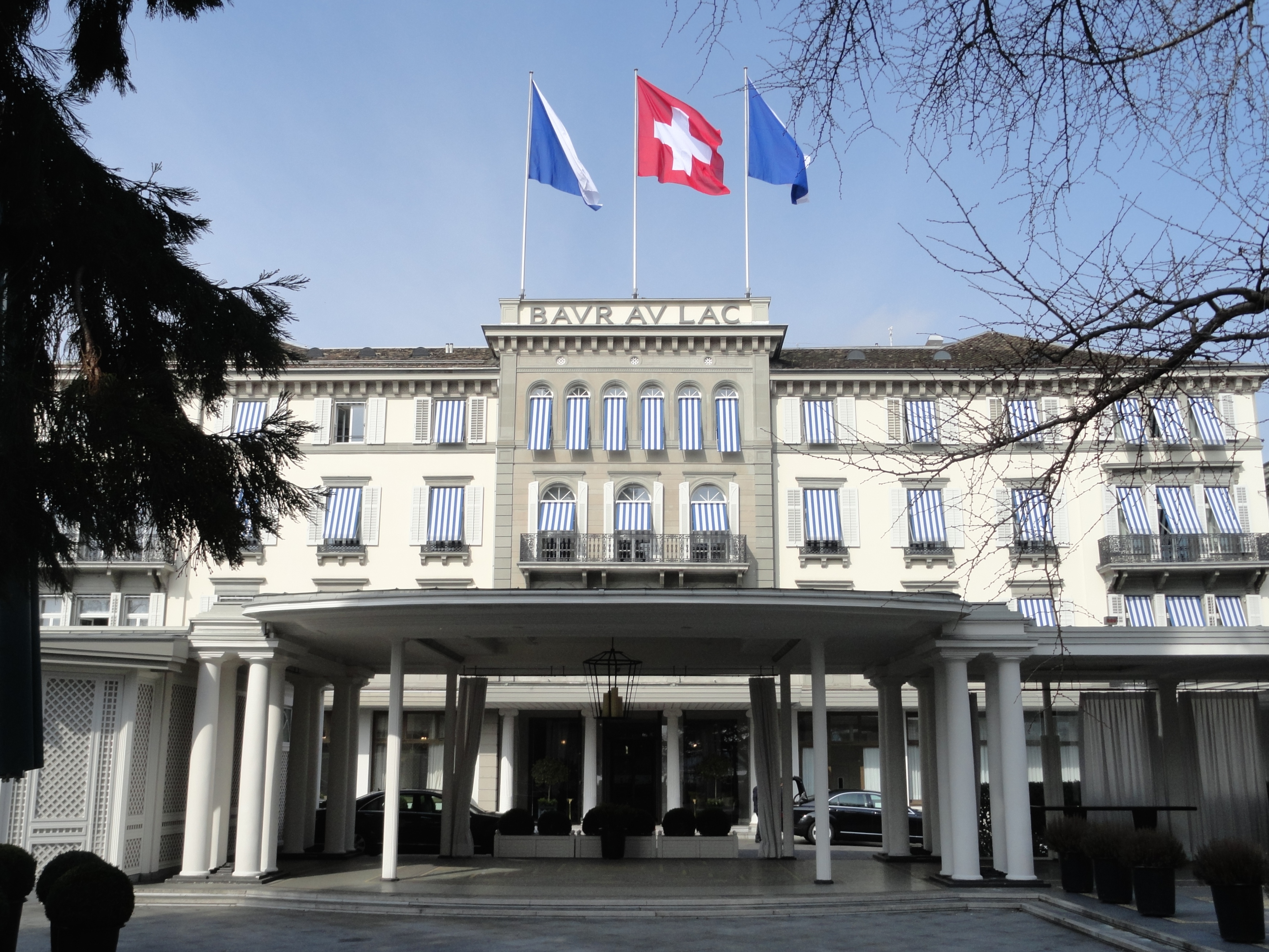
- Interactive map of the Baur au Lac area

General information
- Location: Talstrasse 1; Zurich; Switzerland
- Coordinates: 47°22′1.3692″N 8°32′21.9228″E
- Opening: 1844; 182 years ago

Other information
- Number of rooms: 119
- Number of suites: 18

Website
- Official website

Baur au Lac is a luxury hotel in the city of Zurich, canton of Zurich, Switzerland. It is located near the shores of Lake Zurich and the Schanzengraben moat, in proximity to Bahnhofstrasse and Bürkliplatz.

== History ==
The hotel was founded in 1844 by Johannes Baur, and is still owned by the Baur family. It was completely renovated between 2008 and 2010. It is a member of the Leading Hotels of the World marketing organisation.

== See also ==
- List of hotels in Switzerland
- Tourism in Switzerland
