= Confiserie Sprüngli =

Swiss confectionery manufacturer

Coordinates: 47.36948°N 8.5392°E

- Type: Aktiengesellschaft
- Industry: Confectionery production
- Founded: 1836 (190 years ago)
- Founder: David Sprüngli
- Headquarters: Bahnhofstrasse 21, 8001, Zürich, Switzerland
- Number of locations: 35 (2023)
- Area served: Worldwide
- Key people: Milan Přenosil (Executive Chairman); Tomaš Přenosil (CEO)
- Products: Sugar confectionery
- Net income: CHF 100 million+ (2023)
- Number of employees: 1,000+ (2023)
- Website: spruengli.ch

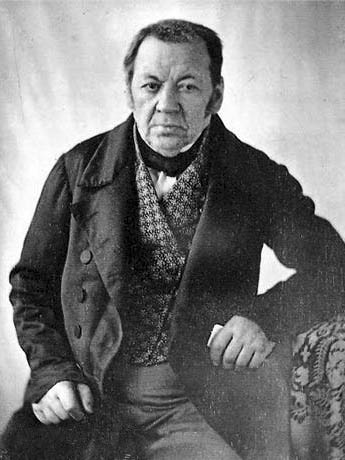
Portrait of the founder, David Sprüngli

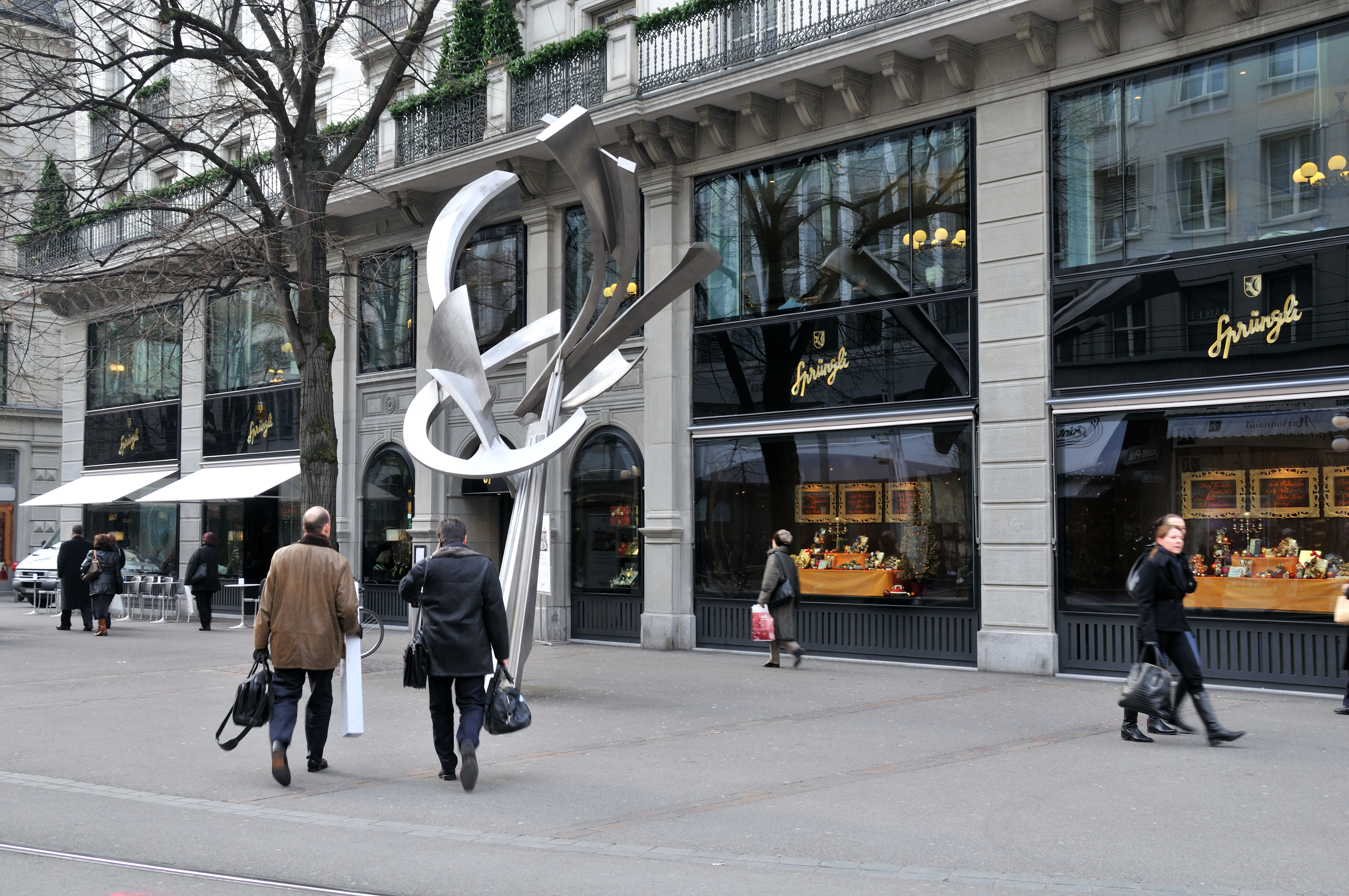
The Sprüngli shop and café on Bahnhofstrasse-Paradeplatz

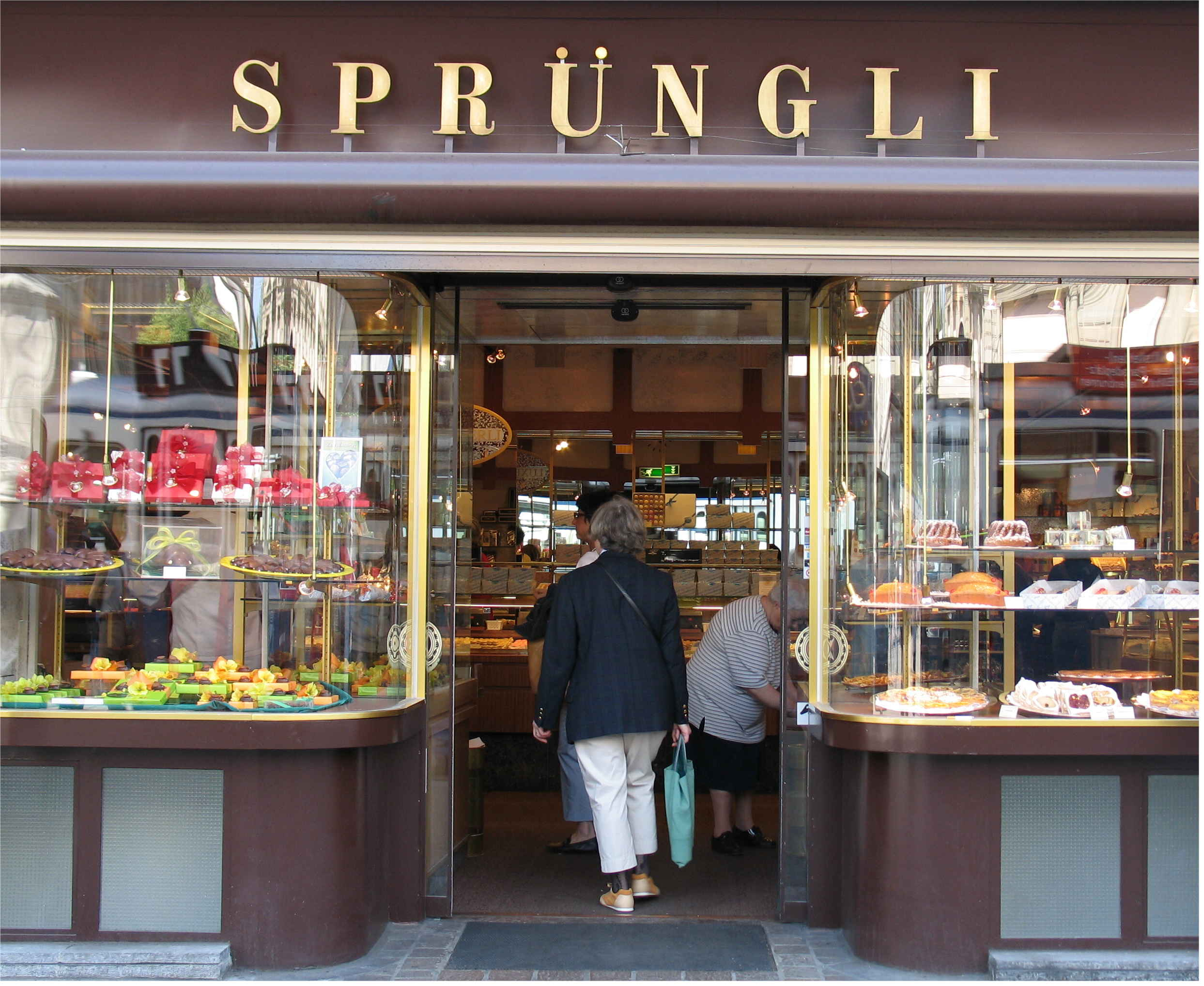
Sprüngli storefront, early 2000s

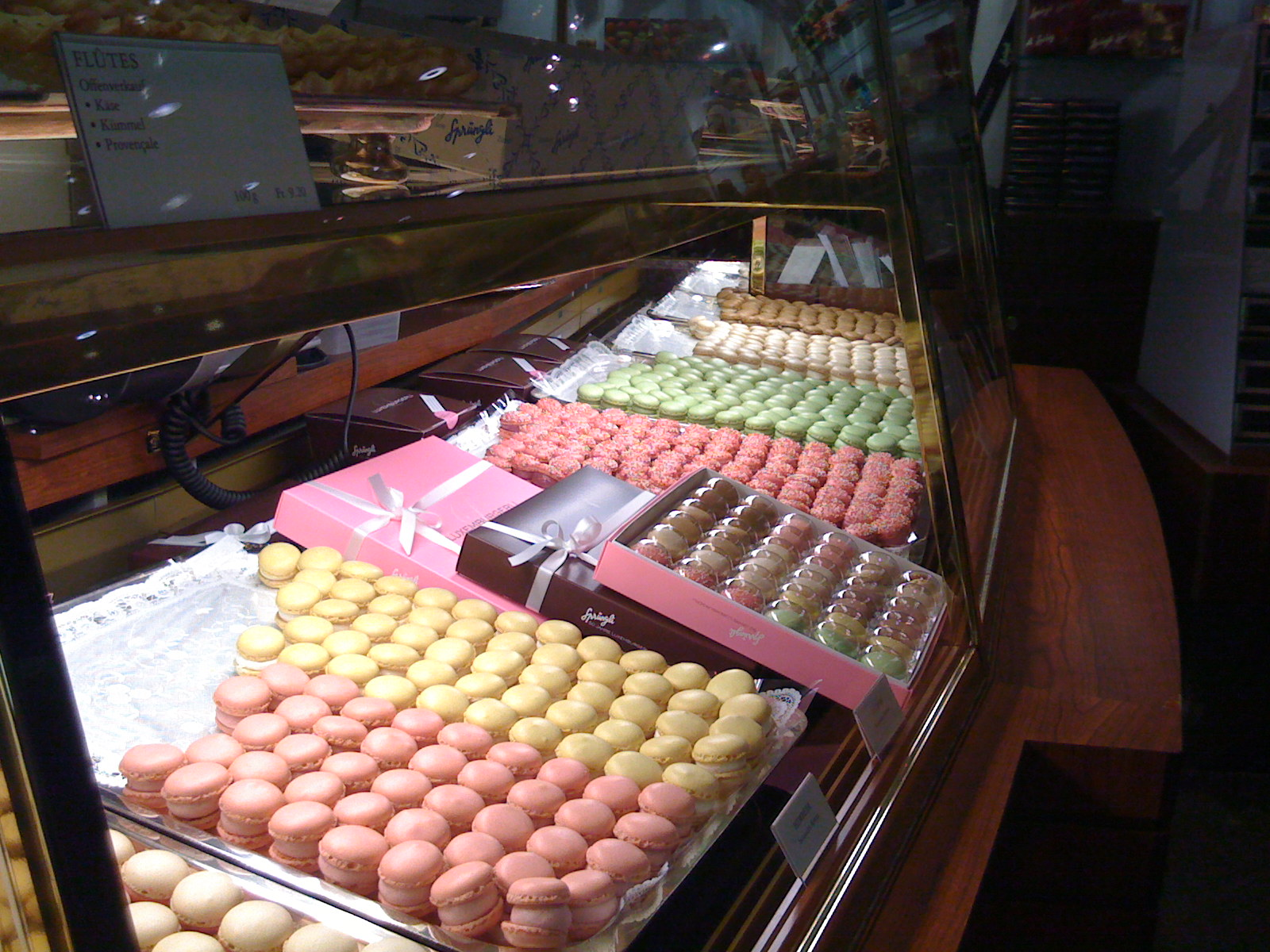
The famous macarons called "Luxemburgerli"

The Confiserie Sprüngli (English: Sprüngli Confectionery) is a Swiss luxury confectionery manufacturer and retailer headquartered in Zürich, Switzerland. Founded in 1836 by David Sprüngli, it has been an independent company from Lindt & Sprüngli since 1892. Today the company is best known for their Luxemburgerli, a form of macarons. Sprüngli operates 35 retail and café locations across Switzerland, Germany, Austria and the United Arab Emirates.

== History ==
The company was founded in 1836 when David Sprüngli bought the confectioner's shop Konditorei Vogel in Zürich. Together with his son Rudolf Sprüngli he started producing chocolates, as David Sprüngli & Fils (engl. David Sprüngli & Son), in 1845 and opened the well-known shop on Paradeplatz on the Bahnhofstrasse in 1859. The so-called "refreshment room" in the new Confiserie was particularly successful. Those who were part of high society in Zurich met there in the afternoon for coffee and cake. In 1892, the chocolate-producing branch of the business split off from the confectionery and now operates independently as Lindt & Sprüngli. Owner of the chocolate factory became Johann Rudolf Sprüngli, son of Rudolf Sprüngli, while his brother, David Robert Sprüngli, was allocated the confectioner's.

In 1956, Richard Sprüngli took over the confiserie and positioned it as a luxury brand. A year later, Sprüngli sold the first Luxemburgerli, a macaron invented by a Sprüngli confectioner from Luxembourg. They are now the company's flagship product of which about 650 kilograms (1,430 lb) are produced daily. Since 1994, the family-owned company has been led by the brothers Tomas and Milan Prenosil, sixth-generation descendants of Rudolf Sprüngli.

In 2020, Sprüngli launched Grand Cru Absolu, a fine chocolate made from 100% cocoa beans and cocoa pulp. In September 2022, Sprüngli introduced vegan pralines in baton form called Grand Cru Bâtons.

== Organisation ==
There have been five changes in ownership of the business since its 1836 founding by David Sprüngli. After David Sprüngli, Hermann Sprüngli took over the management of the company in 1924, followed by Richard Sprüngli (1916–2013) in 1956. In 1994, Richard Sprüngli's two nephews took over the operational management of the company.

- David Sprüngli (1836–1859)
- Rudolf Sprüngli (1859–1892)
- David Robert Sprüngli (1892–1924)
- Hermann Sprüngli (1924–1956)
- Richard Sprüngli (1956–1994)
- Milan and Tomas Přenosil (1994–present), nephews-in-law of Richard Sprüngli

In 2011, Confiserie Sprüngli AG was awarded second place in the SVC Entrepreneurship Prize in the Zurich economic area.

== Products and facilities ==
In 1961, the production facility was moved from Paradeplatz to Dietikon due to a lack of space.

As of 2010, Sprüngli employs some 1,000 staff, has annual sales of more than 100 million Swiss francs and a range of 2,000 products, including ice cream and bakery goods. The company has 29 retail outlets, some of which also include restaurants. The main store is located on Bahnhofstrasse and Paradeplatz, while smaller outlets are found elsewhere in Zürich, as well as in Basel, Bern, Winterthur and Zug. Sprüngli products are also delivered worldwide by air mail and, since 1961, have been produced in Dietikon near Zürich. In 2017, Sprüngli opened an outlet in the Galleria Mall on Al Maryah Island in Abu Dhabi. There are currently three retail shops in the UAE.

The Sprüngli café on Paradeplatz is a traditional meeting-place of the elderly ladies of Zürich's upper class. Local folklore has it that young men who attend the café alone may signal their availability to these well-to-do women by turning over their coffee spoons in their cups. But according to the company's director, this is a persistent myth reflecting Zürich's more puritanical past, when the Sprüngli café was one of the few places where upper-class women could talk to strangers without risking their reputation.

Since March 2021, Sprüngli has a cooperation with Swiss International Air Lines.

== Branches ==
Confiserie Sprüngli sells its products in 29 branches. As of 2020, 17 of the branches were located within Zurich and its metropolitan area with eight additional stores operating in other major Swiss cities. In 2014, the company also expanded abroad to the United Arab Emirates. After opening a branch in Lucerne, Sprüngli is now represented in most Swiss cities. A location was opened at Munich Airport in April 2022 and another at Vienna Airport in December of the same year.

== See also ==
- Swiss chocolate
- List of restaurants in Switzerland
