= Zurich International School =

Coordinates: 47.236679°N 8.634468°E

- Zurich International School logo

Location
- Steinacherstrasse 140, CH-8820 Wädenswil; Switzerland

Information
- Type: Non-profit day school
- Motto: Learn, Care, Challenge, Lead
- Established: 1963
- Director: Elsa Hernández-Donohue
- Age: 3 years to 18 years
- Enrollment: 1300
- Education system: IB Diploma Programme, IB World School, College Board Advanced Placement Courses, Swiss Lehrplan 21
- Campus: Wädenswil (Early Childhood & Lower School), Adliswil (Middle & Upper School)
- Athletics: See text
- Mascot: Lion
- Accreditation: Council of International Schools, New England Association of Schools and Colleges
- Affiliation: Swiss Group of International Schools, Council of International Schools, Council for Advancement and Support of Education, European Council of International Schools, New England Association of Schools and Colleges
- Website: www.zis.ch

Zurich International School (ZIS) is an independent non-profit day school in Switzerland for students aged 3 to 18 in the greater Zurich area. Over 1,300 students from more than 50 countries are enrolled in the school. The school has two campuses: a Primary campus in Wädenswil for Early Childhood and Lower School students aged 3 to 11 and a Secondary Campus in Adliswil for Middle School students aged 11 to 14 and Upper School students aged 14 to 18.

As of 2011, it is the largest international school in the Zurich area.

== History ==
=== American International School of Zurich ===
The American International School of Zurich (AISZ) was founded in 1963 in a Swiss villa (built in 1914) in Kilchberg. The building was renovated and expanded in 1993/4. In 2008, this became the ZIS Middle School for students aged 11 to 14.

=== International Primary School of Zurich ===
The English Language Kindergarten (ELK), later renamed the International Primary School of Zurich (IPSZ), opened in 1970 in Horgen and in 1979 moved to the current Early Childhood Center. This villa, which was built in 1906 on the shore of Lake Zurich in Kilchberg, was attended by children aged three to four until June 2019.

=== Merger and post-merger ===
The Pre-School to Grade 12 Zurich International School was formed in 2001 through the merger of the American International School of Zurich and the International Primary School of Zurich.

The purpose-built Lower School opened in Wädenswil in 2002 and was attended by students aged four to 11 until June 2019. In July 2019, the Early Childhood Center was moved to the Lower School and now children from the age of three to 11 attend the campus.

In 2008, a new Upper School opened in Adliswil and is attended by students aged 14 to 18.

A fifth campus, ZIS Baden, opened in 2008 in the downtown. Initially, this was for children aged three to 11, but in 2010, it expanded to include a Middle School for students aged 11 to 14. This campus closed in July 2015 due to low enrolment.

In August 2022, a new Middle School connected to the upper school in Adliswil opened to form the Secondary Campus.

== Accreditation ==
=== By Swiss authorities ===
ZIS's Kindergarten and primary education programs (Lower School) are approved by the bureau for elementary school (Volksschulamt), administration for education (Bildungsdirektion), canton of Zurich.

In August 2021, ZIS launched a bilingual program based on the curriculum of the Canton of Zurich Lehrplan 21 and approved by it. It is for students aged 3 – 10 and will grow over the coming years up to Grade 9.

ZIS's lower secondary education (Middle school) is approved as Sekundarstufe by the bureau for elementary school (Volksschulamt), administration for education (Bildungsdirektion), canton of Zurich.

However, ZIS's upper secondary education (Upper School) is not approved as a Mittelschule by the bureau for gymnasial and vocational education (Mittelschul- und Berufsbildungsamt), administration of education (Bildungsdirektion), canton of Zurich, or by the Swiss Federal State Secretariat for Education, Research and Innovation (SERI).

=== By American and international authorities ===
ZIS is an International Baccalaureate (IB Organization World School). ZIS is accredited by both the Council of International Schools and the New England Association of Schools and Colleges. The school offers both the International Baccalaureate Diploma and Advanced Placement courses.

Swiss Universities recognise the International Baccalaureate Diploma for Admission to Swiss Universities, which make entry to Swiss Universities possible for ZIS students. Many Swiss Universities also accept an upper secondary school-leaving certificate and Advanced Placement Tests for admission to Swiss Universities, however AP subjects and the number of AP examinations vary by university.

== Language program ==
The main instruction language is English. Students in Pre-Kindergarten to Grade 9 are required to learn German, unless they are in the English as an Additional Language (EAL) program. Students can choose to learn either French or Spanish from Grade 6 (age 11) onward.

A large number of students at ZIS arrive knowing little or no English. The EAL program includes small group lessons to help them improve their language skills, it is available in the lower school, middle school and upper school curriculum.

== Sports ==
All students from Pre-School to Grade 10 (aged three to 16) take physical education as part of their educational program. At the Early Childhood Center, PE is combined with other activities. ZIS uses its facilities as well as local sport centers.

== Arts ==
All students from Pre-School to Grade 6 have compulsory music lessons. Students in Grade 3 learn the recorder, while students in Grades 4 and 5 can learn another instrument. In Middle School, there are choirs/band/orchestra. Students of all ages can take private music lessons on school premises with selected music teachers. There are choirs at the Lower, Middle and Upper Schools and regular concerts and recitals through the year for students of all ages. In Middle and Upper Schools, students can take drama as a class and can also participate in the twice-yearly productions, such as 'Grease' and 'Les Miserables'. At Upper School, students can direct and perform plays and shows as part of their studies. Art is part of the curriculum at the Early Childhood Center and Lower School, and an option for Middle and Upper School students. Notably, ZIS offers the opportunity for students to audition for the AMIS program, which hosts annual festivals for band, orchestra, jazz band and choir at different international schools in the country.
