= Lindt =

Swiss chocolate maker

Chocoladefabriken Lindt & Sprüngli AG

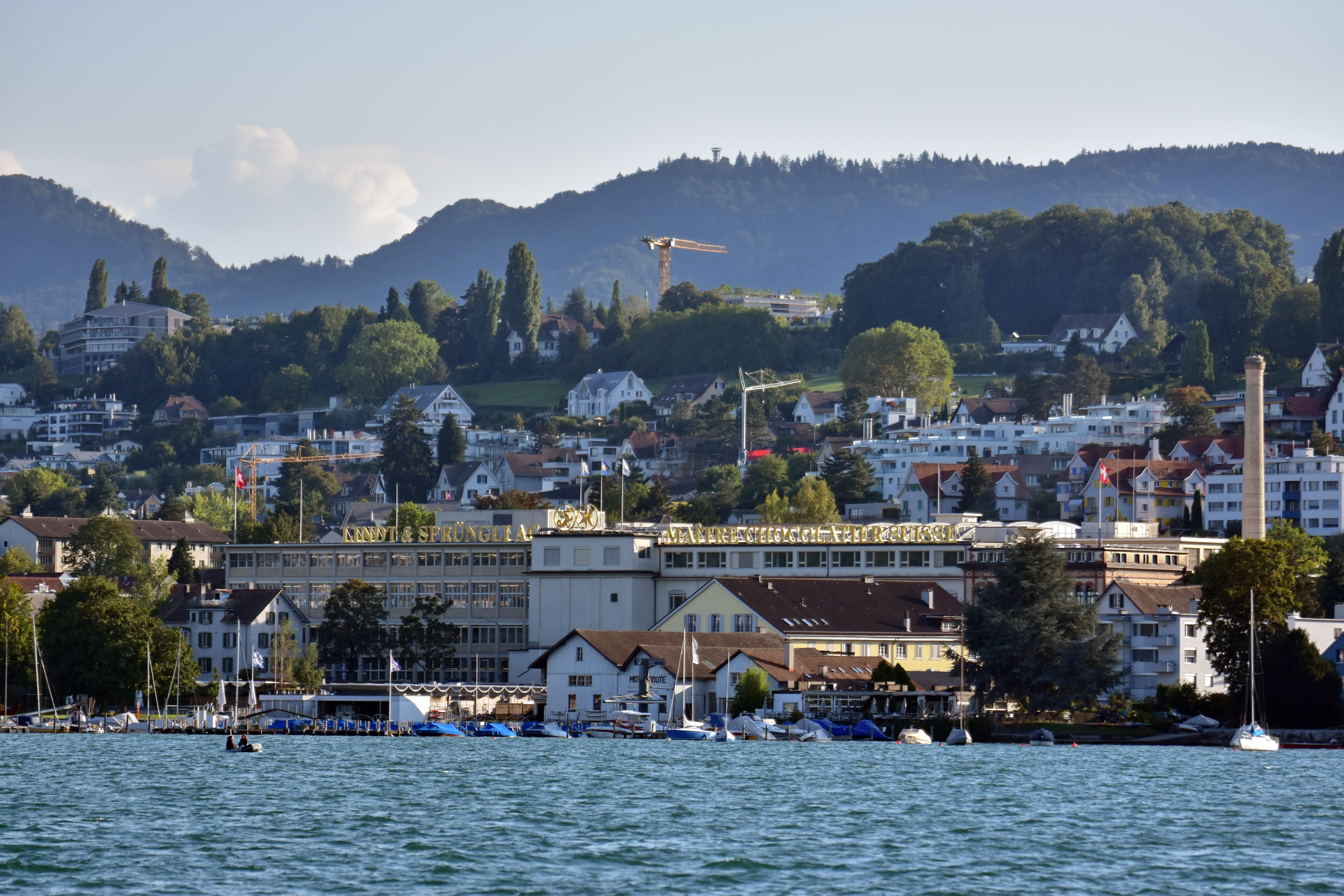
- Headquarters and factory in Kilchberg
- Type: Public (Aktiengesellschaft)
- Traded as: SIX: LISN (registered share); SIX: LISP (participation certificate)
- ISIN: CH0010570759; CH0010570767
- Industry: Confectionery
- Founded: 1845 (181 years ago)
- Founders: David Sprüngli; Rudolf Lindt
- Headquarters: Kilchberg, Switzerland
- Key people: Ernst Tanner (Executive Chairman); Adalbert Lechner (CEO)
- Products: Chocolate; confectionery; ice cream
- Revenue: ▲CHF 5.92 billion (2025)
- Operating income: ▲CHF 884 million (2024)
- Net income: ▲CHF 672 million (2024)
- Total assets: ▼CHF 9.16 billion (2024)
- Total equity: ▼CHF 4.84 billion (2024)
- Owner: Lindt & Sprüngli AG Fonds für Pensionsergänzungen (15.43%); Ernst Tanner (2.277%); Rudolf Konrad Sprüngli (0.8091%)
- Number of employees: 14,466 (2022)
- Subsidiaries: Ghirardelli; Russell Stover; Caffarel; Hofbauer; Küfferle
- Website: lindt-spruengli.com

Chocoladefabriken Lindt & Sprüngli AG, (Note: transl. Chocolate Factories Lindt & Sprüngli AG; pronounced [ʃokoˈlaːdəfaˌbriːkn̩ ˈlɪnt ʊnd ˈʃprʏŋli aːˈɡeː]) doing business as Lindt, is a Swiss chocolatier and confectionery company founded in 1845 and known for its chocolate truffles and chocolate bars, among other sweets. It is based in Kilchberg, where its main factory and museum are located. Lindt is one of the largest Swiss chocolate manufacturers.

== History ==
=== Founding and early years ===
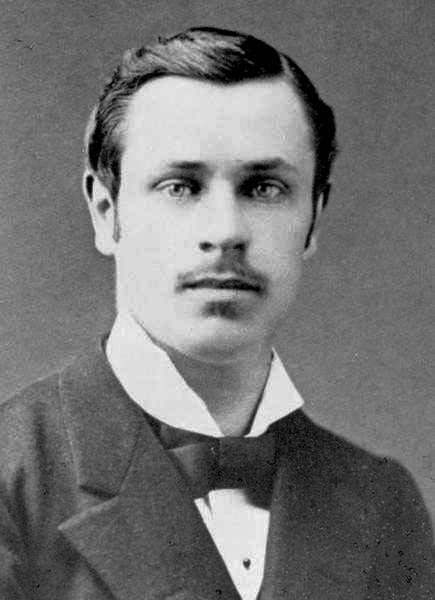
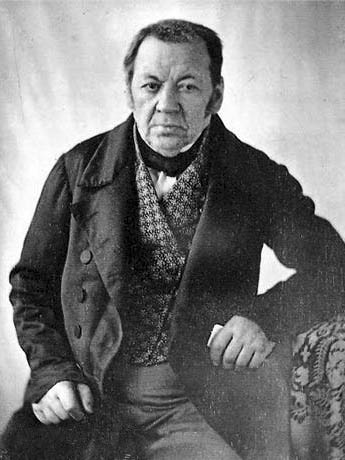
Rodolphe Lindt (left) and David Sprüngli, founders

The origins of the company date back to 1836, when David Sprüngli (1776–1862) and his son Rudolf Sprüngli-Ammann (1816–1897) bought a small confectionery shop in the old town of Zürich, producing chocolates under the name David Sprüngli & Son. Before they moved to Paradeplatz in 1845, they established a small factory where they produced their chocolate in solidified form in 1838.

When Rudolf Sprüngli-Ammann retired in 1892, he gave two equal parts of the business to his sons. The younger brother David Robert received two confectionery stores that became known under the name Confiserie Sprüngli. The elder brother Johann Rudolf received the chocolate factory. To raise the necessary finances for his expansion plans, Johann Rudolf then converted his private company into "Chocolat Sprüngli AG" in 1899. In that same year, he acquired the chocolate factory of Rodolphe Lindt (1855–1909) in Bern, which Lindt had founded in 1879, and the company changed its name to "Aktiengesellschaft Vereinigte Berner und Zürcher Chocoladefabriken Lindt & Sprüngli" (United Bern and Zurich Lindt and Sprungli Chocolate Factory Ltd.).

Although solid milk chocolate had been invented in Switzerland in 1875, Lindt first began producing milk chocolate in 1934. Before, it only produced dark chocolate.

In 1936, Lindt & Sprüngli signed a production licence agreement with the German company Leonard Monheim AG. In 1986, Lindt & Sprüngli took over production and since then, the majority of its internationally distributed products are manufactured in Aachen near the Westbahnhof.

=== Expansion ===
In 1994, Lindt & Sprüngli acquired the Austrian chocolatier Hofbauer Österreich and integrated it, along with its Küfferle brand, into the company. In 1997 and 1998, respectively, the company acquired the Italian chocolatier Caffarel and the American chocolatier Ghirardelli, and integrated both of them into the company as wholly owned subsidiaries. Since then, Lindt & Sprüngli has expanded the once-regional Ghirardelli to the international market.

On 17 March 2009, Lindt announced the closure of fifty of its eighty retail boutiques in the United States because of weaker demand in the wake of the late-2000s recession.

On 26 March 2012, the Supreme Court in Vienna ruled in a decade-long case against Austrian manufacturer Hauswirth that the golden chocolate bunny with a red ribbon, also known as the Gold Bunny, may only be sold in Austria in this form by Lindt & Sprüngli. On 24 May 2012, Lindt & Sprüngli was defeated at the European Court of Justice in its attempt to obtain trademark protection for the Gold Bunny throughout Europe. In the application proceedings, which had been ongoing since 2004, the company was unable to prove that the average European consumer would identify the manufacturer of the bunny from its appearance. EU-wide protection was therefore not possible. On 28 March 2013, the Federal Court of Justice in Karlsruhe dismissed an appeal by Lindt & Sprüngli against a ruling by the Frankfurt am Main Higher Regional Court allowing the Franconian company Riegelein to sell a sitting chocolate bunny. The German manufacturer offers its bunny in a slightly darker, bronze-coloured foil. The Federal Court of Justice's decision ruled out any likelihood of confusion between the two products.

On 18 December 2012, it was announced that Lindt & Sprüngli had lost a lawsuit against Haribo before the Cologne Regional Court due to the similarity between the Lindt & Sprüngli "Lindt Teddy" chocolate bear and the Haribo Gold Bears, and had to withdraw the chocolate bears from the market. However, in April 2014, the Cologne Higher Regional Court overturned the decision, allowing the bears to continue to be sold for the time being. The Cologne Higher Regional Court then dismissed the Bonn-based gummy bear manufacturer's lawsuit. Haribo appealed against this decision to the Federal Court of Justice. This was rejected by the Federal Court of Justice in Karlsruhe in September 2015. The judges ruled that Haribo's trademark rights were not infringed by the "Lindt Teddy".

On 14 July 2014, Lindt bought Russell Stover Candies, maker of Whitman's Chocolate, for about $1 billion, the company's largest acquisition to date. Due to the 60% praline market share of Russel Stover, Lindt became the third largest chocolate company in North America, while also having a presence with its other brands.

=== Corporate developments ===
In September 2017, an investigation conducted by NGO Mighty Earth found that a large amount of the cocoa used in chocolate produced by Lindt and other major chocolate companies was grown illegally in national parks and other protected areas in the Ivory Coast and Ghana, the world's two largest cocoa producers. Mighty Earth's 2019 annual "Easter Chocolate Shopping Guide" awarded The Good Egg Award to Lindt "for greatest improvement in sustainable policies". However, in terms of agroforestry, Lindt scored only a yellow rating, the second-highest of 4, for Agroforestry and a red ('needs to catch up with the industry') for Agrochemical Management on the 2022 Chocolate Scorecard, which since 2020 is a collaboration between Mighty Earth, Be Slavery Free and other NGOs.

In November 2018, Lindt opened its first American travel retail store in JFK Airport's Terminal 1 and a new flagship Canadian store in Yorkdale Shopping Centre, Toronto.

Because the chocolate bunnies sold by Confiserie Heilemann in 2018 were too similar to Lindt's Gold Bunny, the Munich Higher Regional Court prohibited Heilemann from selling any more chocolate bunnies in 2022. The colour and design were not sufficiently different from Lindt's Gold Bunny. The Federal Supreme Court had previously classified Lindt's Gold Bunny as a trademark.

In August 2020, the Federal Antimonopoly Service of Russia (FAS) opened up an antitrust case against Lindt after a failed response from the company a year earlier. The regulators have found quality differences for the same Lindt products in Russia over what is being sold in Western markets without informing Russian consumers. According to the FAS, such behaviour of foreign producers can lead to a redistribution of demand in the market and lead to unjustified benefits over other competitors, as companies like Lindt can still garner Russian demand for their products through brand recognition alone without delivering the same quality as in Western Europe. Lindt responded and denied that there are differences for its products sold in Russia and the EU, except for labeling. However, in response to the 2022 Russian invasion of Ukraine, Lindt announced on 9 March 2022 that it would temporarily close its eight Russian shops and suspend deliveries to Russia, and on 13 August 2022, the company announced that it would permanently exit the Russian market.

Lindt achieved sales of CHF 4.6 billion in 2021, an increase of 14.2 per cent over the previous year. Net profit increased by 53.2 per cent to CHF 490.5 million. In the previous year, sales fell by 6.1 per cent to CHF 4.02 billion.

In 2022, Lindt & Sprüngli was criticised for wasting food. In order to avoid discount campaigns, employees of the company used cardboard knives or ballpoint pens to destroy Lindt products in several Edeka stores in northern Hesse that were still a few weeks from reaching their expiration date. Lindt's statement that the company only offers "goods that meet quality standards", which is why "products that are no longer fit for consumption or sale are marked as unfit for sale by the field sales force and removed from the store", did not dispel the allegation.

In December 2022, Lindt was among one of many dark chocolate bars that have contained either high amounts of lead or cadmium metals, when compared against California's maximum daily allowable dose level, according to Consumer Reports study "Lead and Cadmium Could Be in Your Dark Chocolate". The cadmium levels are still within the EU limit of 0.80mg/kg for dark chocolate.

In 2023, Lindt partnered with ChoViva, a German cocoa-free chocolate brand, and launched vegan chocolates using oats and sunflower seeds.

In July 2023, the company announced that it would no longer target advertising to children under 16. In doing so, the company aims to align itself with market Best Practice.

In January 2024, Schweizer Radio und Fernsehen conducted an investigation in Ghana and uncovered child labour on the plantations where cocoa is produced for Lindt & Sprüngli. According to the report, the company's monitoring programme in Ghana, where Lindt sources from around 80,000 farmers, proved to be inadequate.

In 2024, an extension to the Olten plant, which Lindt says is the company's largest cocoa mass plant, was opened.

=== Lindt Café siege ===
On 15–16 December 2014 a terrorist attack occurred when a lone gunman, Man Haron Monis, held ten customers and eight employees of a Lindt Chocolate Café hostage in the APA Building in Martin Place, Sydney, Australia.

== Factories ==
Lindt & Sprüngli has twelve factories: Kilchberg, Switzerland; Aachen, Germany; Oloron-Sainte-Marie, France; Induno Olona, Italy; Gloggnitz, Austria; and Stratham, New Hampshire, in the United States. The factory in Gloggnitz manufactures products under the Hofbauer & Küfferle brand, in addition to the Lindt brand. Caffarel's factory is located in Luserna San Giovanni, Italy, and Ghirardelli's factory is located in San Leandro, California, in the United States. Furthermore, there are four more factories of Russell Stover in the United States, including locations in Corsicana, Texas; Abilene, Kansas; and Iola, Kansas.

== Museum ==
Since 2020, the main factory of Kilchberg has included a visitor centre and museum, referred to as Lindt Home of Chocolate. The museum notably displays the world's largest chocolate fountain, measuring over nine metres tall and containing 1,500 litres of chocolate, flowing from a giant whisk. The museum takes the visitor through the history of chocolate and the chocolate industry. There are plenty of opportunities to taste various kinds of chocolate at the end of the tour.

== Notable products ==
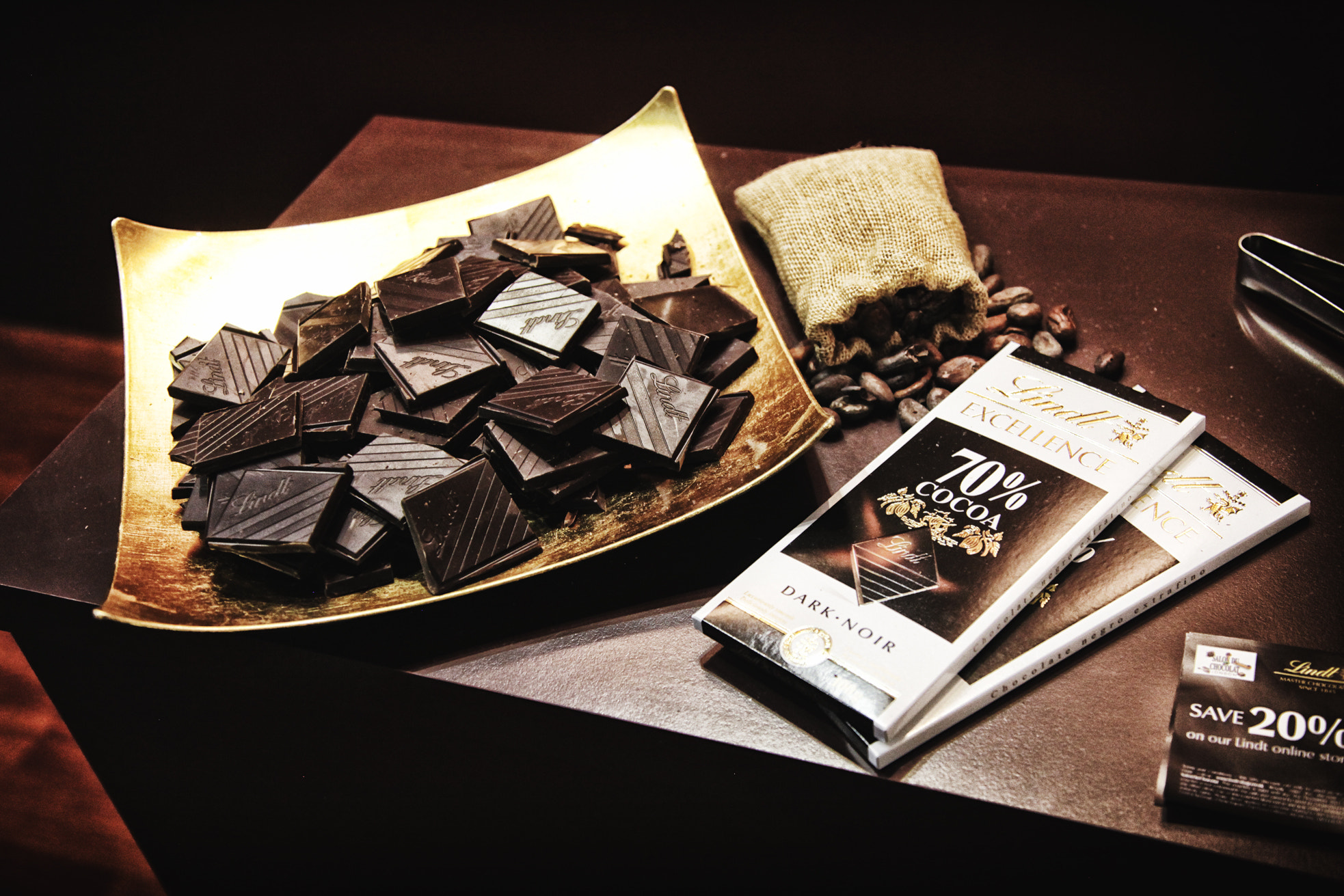
Excellence

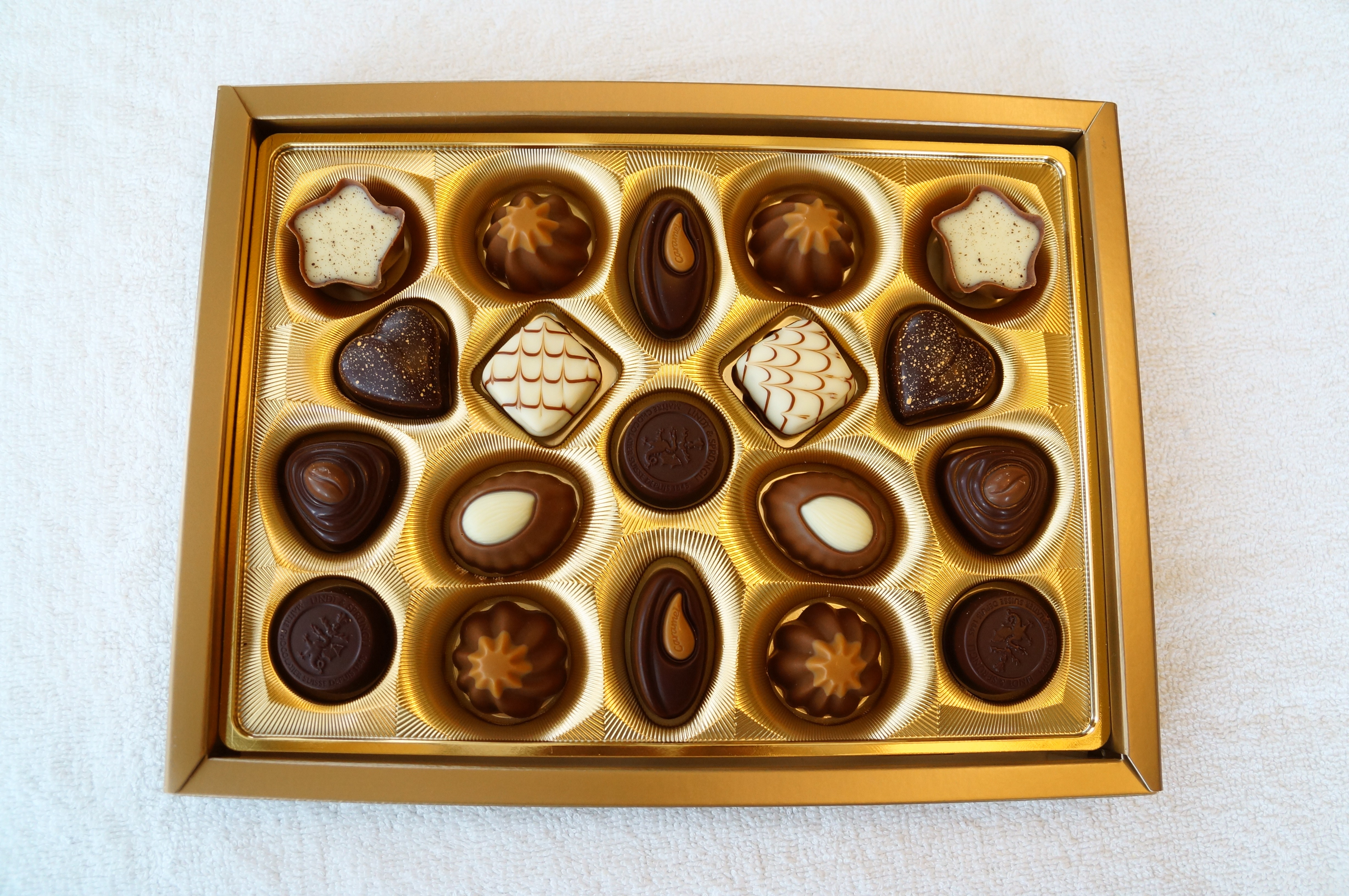
Pralines

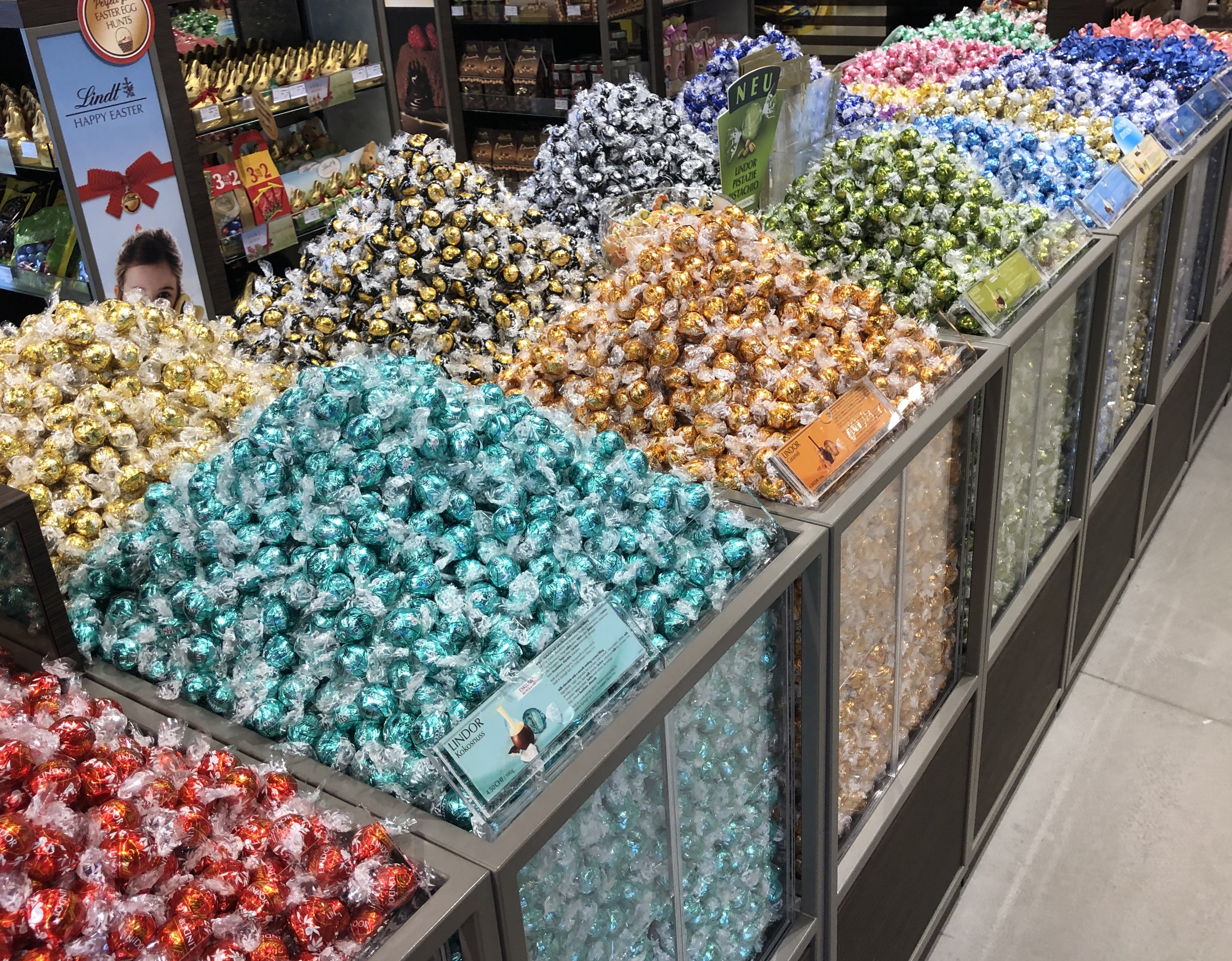
Lindor

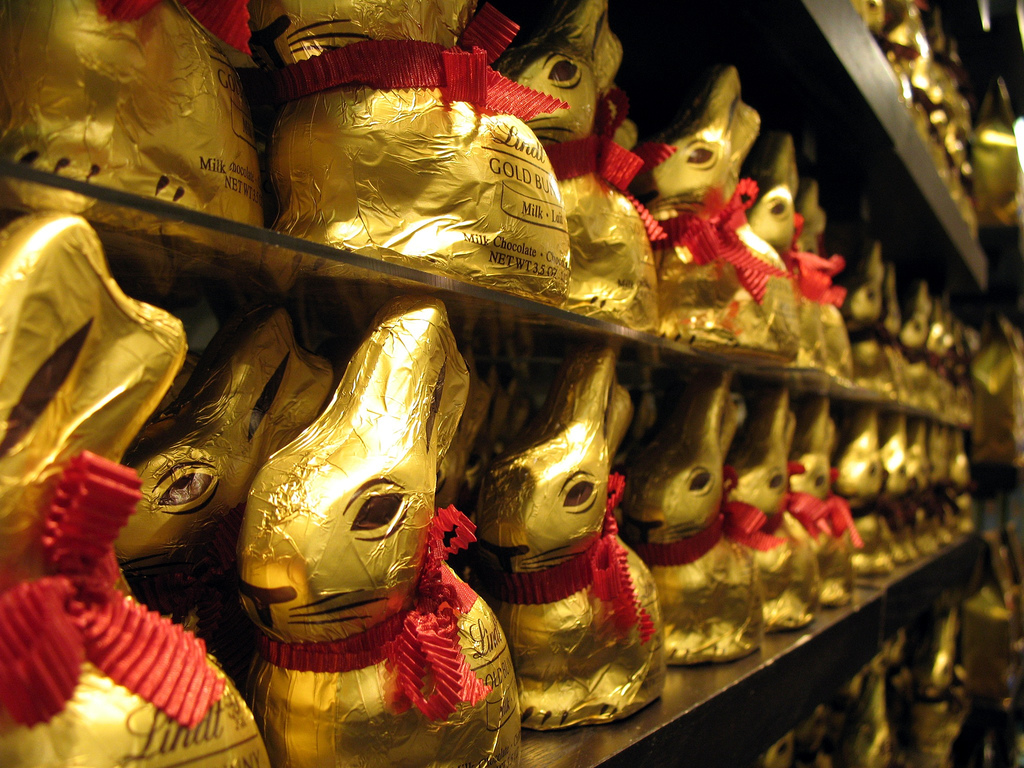
Gold Bunny

== Lindt chocolate cafés and stores ==
Lindt has opened over 410 chocolate cafés and shops all over the world. The cafés' menu mostly focuses on chocolate and desserts. Lindt chocolate cafés also sell handmade chocolates, macaroons, cakes, and ice cream.

On 15 December 2014, eighteen people, including eight staff, were held hostage at a Lindt café in Sydney. Three people, including the gunman, died in the incident.

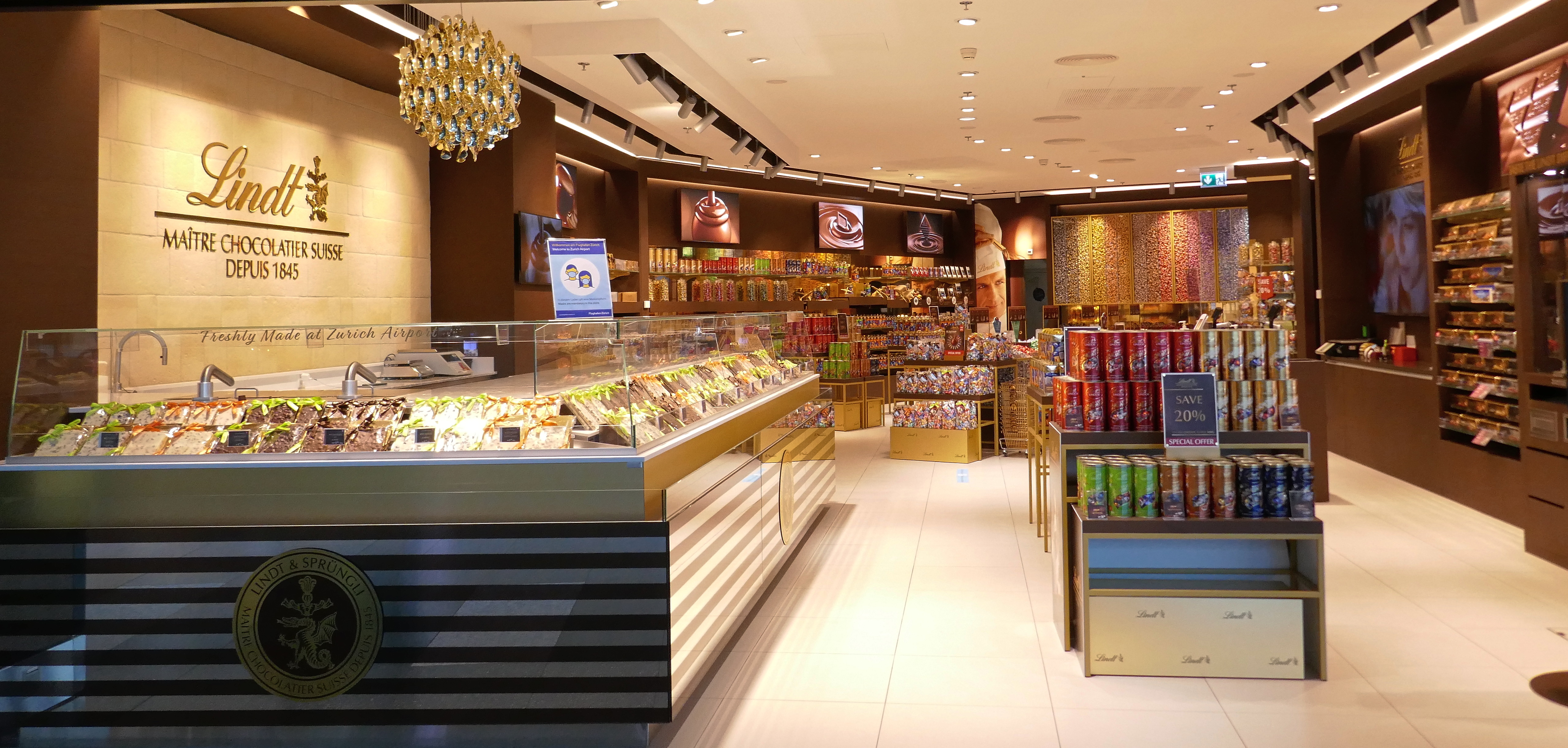
Lindt store at Zurich Airport

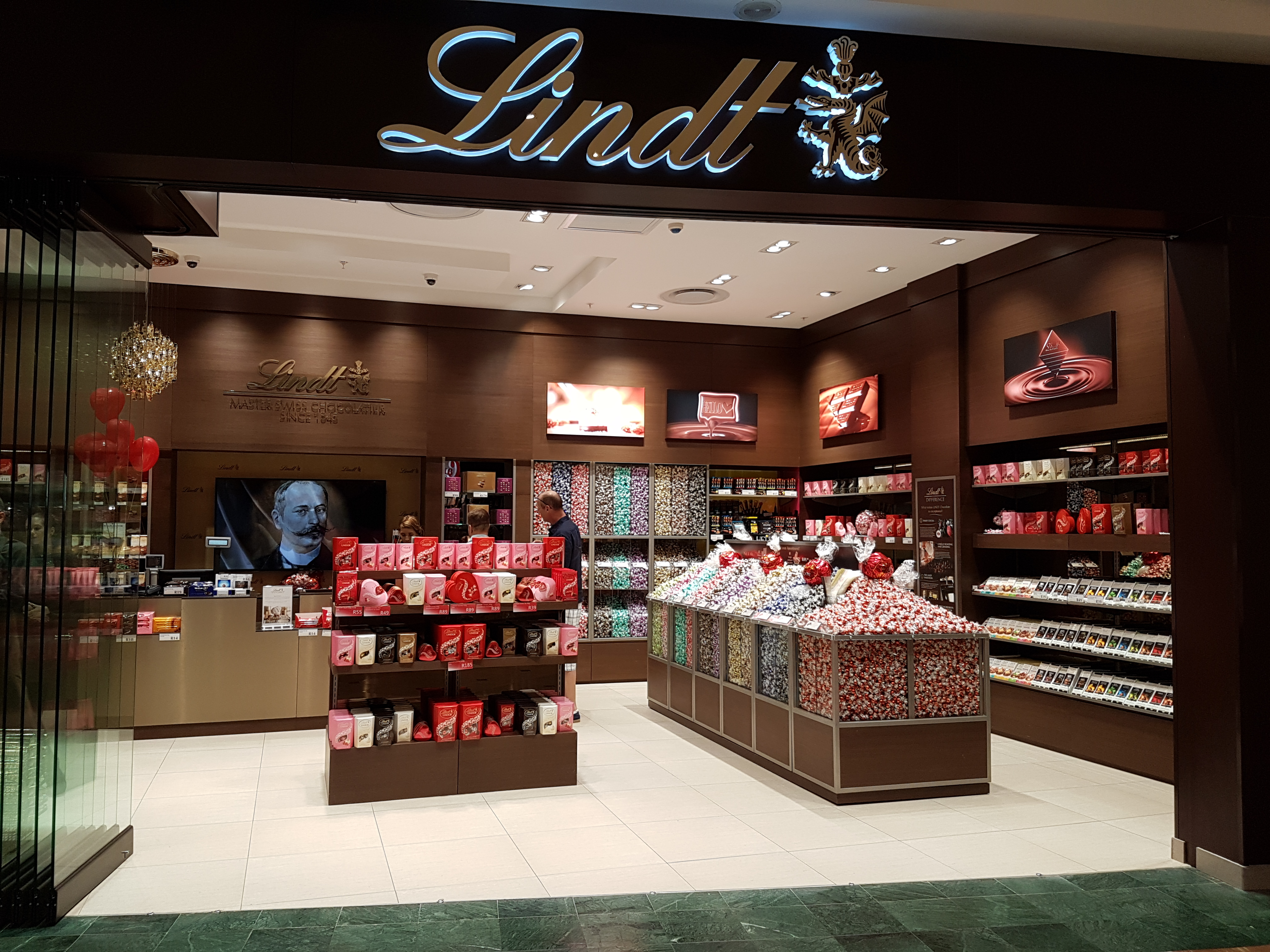
Lindt store in Canal Walk mall, Cape Town

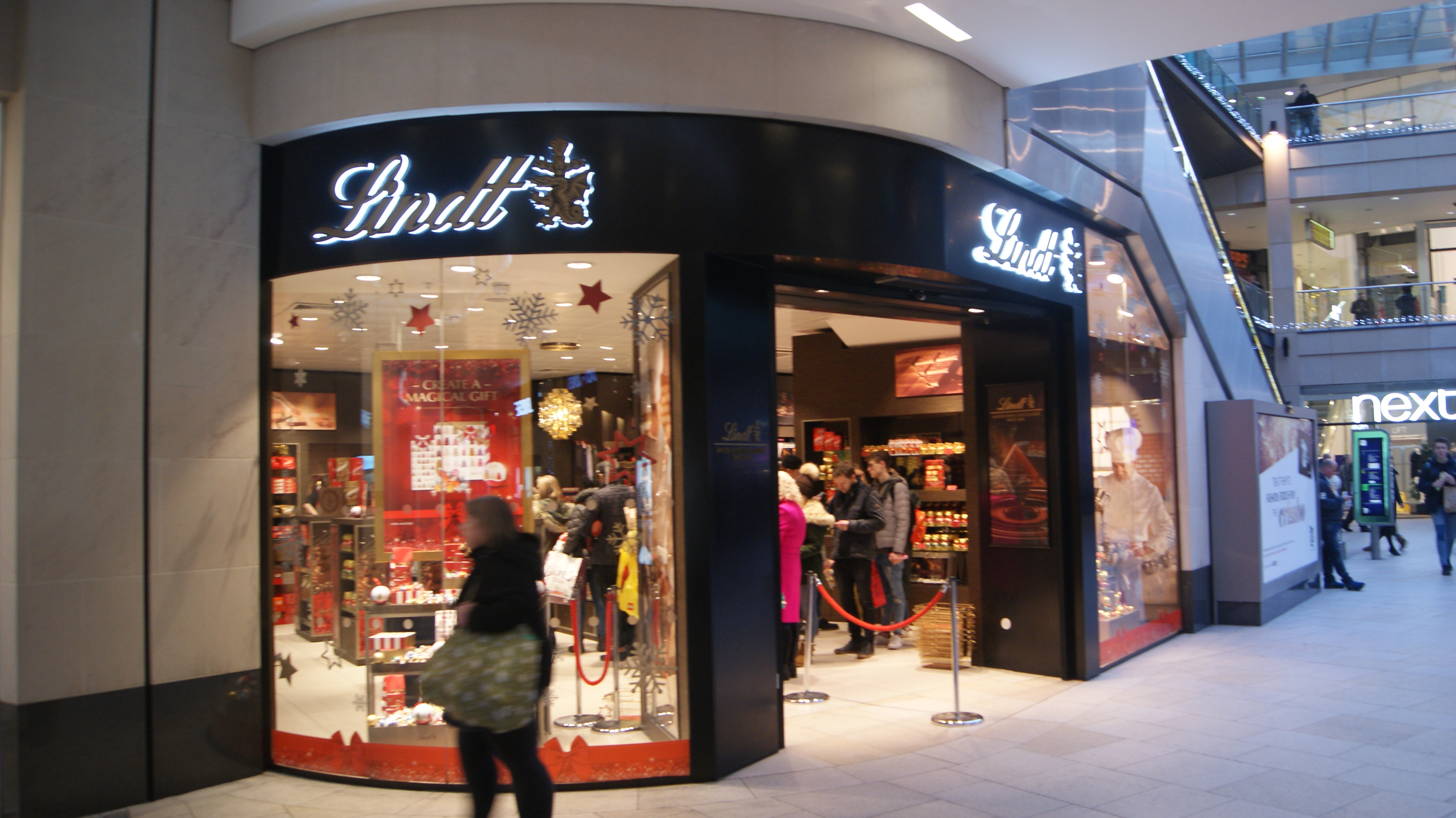
Lindt store in Leeds

== See also ==
- List of bean-to-bar chocolate manufacturers
- Cocoa-free chocolate alternative
- The Lindt Cafe siege
