= David Sprüngli =

Swiss merchant

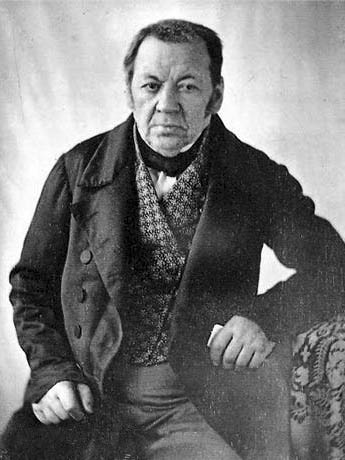
- Portrait of Sprüngli from the first half of the 19th century
- Born: David Sprüngli; 20 October 1776; Andelfingen, Switzerland
- Died: 14 February 1862 (aged 85)
- Occupation: confectioner
- Known for: founding Confiserie Sprüngli
- Children: 2

David Sprüngli (20 October 1776 – 14 February 1862) was a Swiss businessman, baker and confectioner. In 1836, he founded David Sprüngli & Son, now known as Confiserie Sprüngli. He was the patriarch of the Zurich-based branch of the Sprüngli family.

== Early life and education ==
Sprüngli was born 20 October 1776 in Andelfingen, Switzerland, a then rural village in the Zürcher Oberland region, to Hans Heinrich Sprüngli, a financially destitute tailor, and Elisabetha Sprüngli (née Karrer). He was raised in a modest family and was orphaned by 1784 aged 8.

He relocated to Zurich in 1797 aged 18, where he initially worked as a servant at the bakery of Hans Rudolf Koller until 1814 (also completing an apprenticeship as baker/confectioner).

== Career ==
Between 1817 and 1834, Sprüngli worked for Hans Jakob Vogel, who specialised in sweet baking goods and confectionary. Upon his death, he acquired the business, from the widow and became self-employed.

In 1836, Sprüngli purchased a commercial building, at Marktgasse. His business was now known as David Sprüngli & Son, a collective partnership with his son Rudolf Sprüngli. In 1845, he began to commercially manufacture chocolate, and they built and operated a small factory in Horgen on Lake Zurich. In 1859, they moved in today's location of Confiserie Sprüngli on Paradeplatz.

In 1892, long after his death, the company was divided into two business units. The factory was allocated to Johann Rudolf Sprüngli, who successfully industrialised the company, and together with another chocolate manufacturing company in Berne, was merged to Lindt & Sprüngli i n 1899 for the amount of 1,5 million Swiss Francs (about 100 million in 2023). David Robert Sprüngli was allocated the confectionary business presently known as Confiserie Sprüngli.

== Personal life ==
In 1804, Sprüngli married Regula Rosenberger, a daughter of Heinrich Rosenberger. The marriage did not result in any issue. In 1812, he remarried to Katharina Schwarz, a daughter of Hans Schwarz. They had two sons;

- David Robert Sprüngli (born 1814)
- Johann Rudolf Sprüngli, colloquially Rudolf Sprüngli (1816–1897); married to Elisabetha Ammann; two sons; Rudolf Sprüngli (1847-1926), David Robert Sprüngli (1851–1944).

In 1838, Sprüngli took the municipal citizenship of Zurich, and became a member of the Zunft zur Schiffleuten (Guild) in 1839. Sprüngli died in Zurich in 1862, aged 85.
