= Paradeplatz =

Square in Zurich, Switzerland

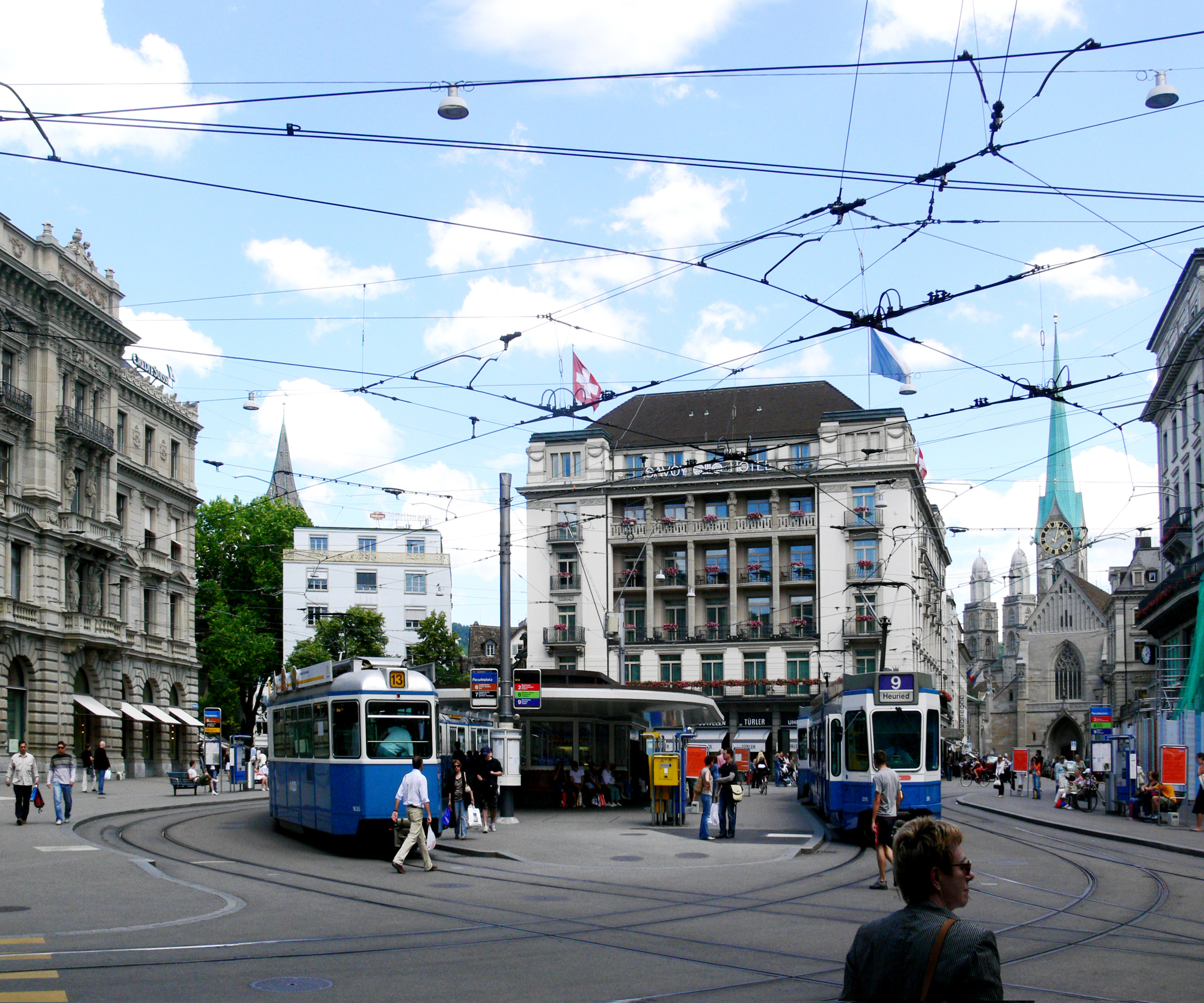
- Paradeplatz tram stop in 2007, looking east towards Hotel Baur en Ville

- Location within Canton of Zurich
- Former names: Säumärt, Neumarkt
- Type: tramway, pedestrian
- Location: Zurich, Switzerland
- Coordinates: 47.3697°N 8.5389°E
- North: Credit Suisse Bank
- East: Mandarin Oriental Savoy
- South: Confiserie Sprüngli
- West: UBS Bank

Paradeplatz (lit. 'Parade square') is a square on Bahnhofstrasse in downtown Zurich, Switzerland. It is one of the most expensive pieces of real estate in Switzerland and has become synonymous with wealth and the Swiss banks, being the location of the headquarters of both UBS and Credit Suisse. It is surrounded by four blocks of buildings.

== Constituent buildings ==
In the block to the north, which is bounded by Talacker to the west, Bahnhofstrasse to the east and Paradeplatz to the south, is the home of Credit Suisse, amongst other businesses. The building, formerly known as the Kreditanstalt building, dates to 1873. The Lichthof shopping mall is at the eastern corner of the building.

The hotel Baur en Ville (now Mandarin Oriental Savoy), on the eastern end of the square, opened in 1838. Also in this block is the Blancpain watch store and the Harry Winston jewellery store. This block is bounded by Züghusplatz (lit. 'Armory Square') to the north and Poststrasse to the south.

The Confiserie Sprüngli, in the southern block, opened in 1859. It is bounded by Paradeplatz to the north, Bahnhofstrasse to the east and Bleicherweg to the west.

The UBS (formerly Bankverein) building on the western side dates to 1897–1899. It is bounded by Talacker to the north, Paradeplatz to the east and Bleicherweg to the south.

== Transportation ==
Paradeplatz is closed to cars, but accessible by tram or on foot. The square's Paradeplatz tram stop is one of the main nodal points of the Zurich tram network operated by VBZ.

== History ==
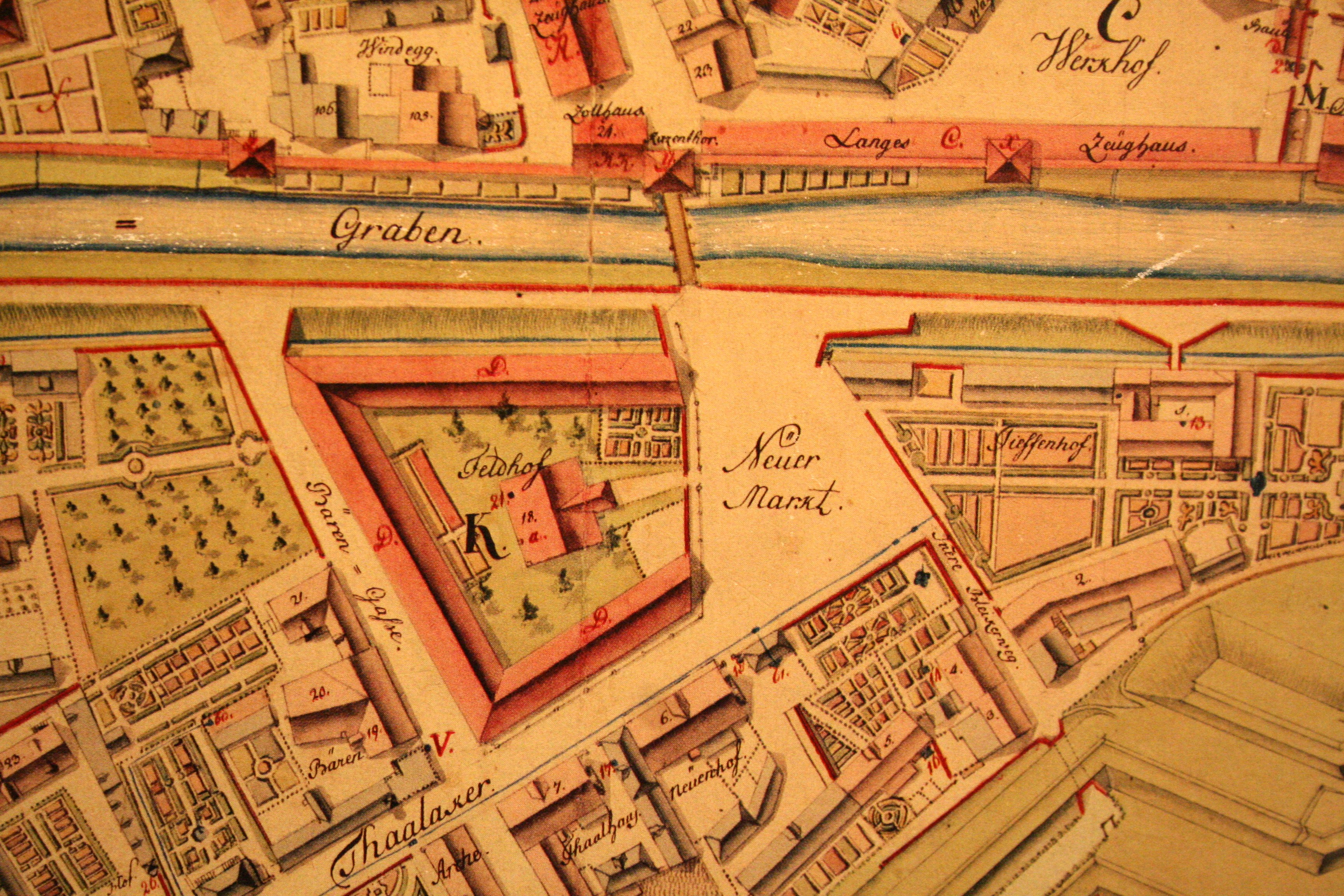
Neuer Markt as it was in 1793, situated outside, reached from the Zeughaus by a footbridge across the old moat (Graben, now Bahnhofstrasse)

The site of the square once lay outside of the medieval city walls, and was incorporated into the town with the construction of the new ramparts in 1642. During the 17th century, it served as a livestock market, known as Säumärt (lit. 'pig market'). In 1819 it was renamed Neumarkt (lit. 'new market', not to be confused with Neumarkt in Zurich's old town). In 1865, following the construction of Bahnhofstrasse, the square received its current name.

Paradeplatz was the scene of clashes between insurgents and cantonal troops during the 1839 Züriputsch (lit. 'Zurich Coup').

== Panoramic view ==
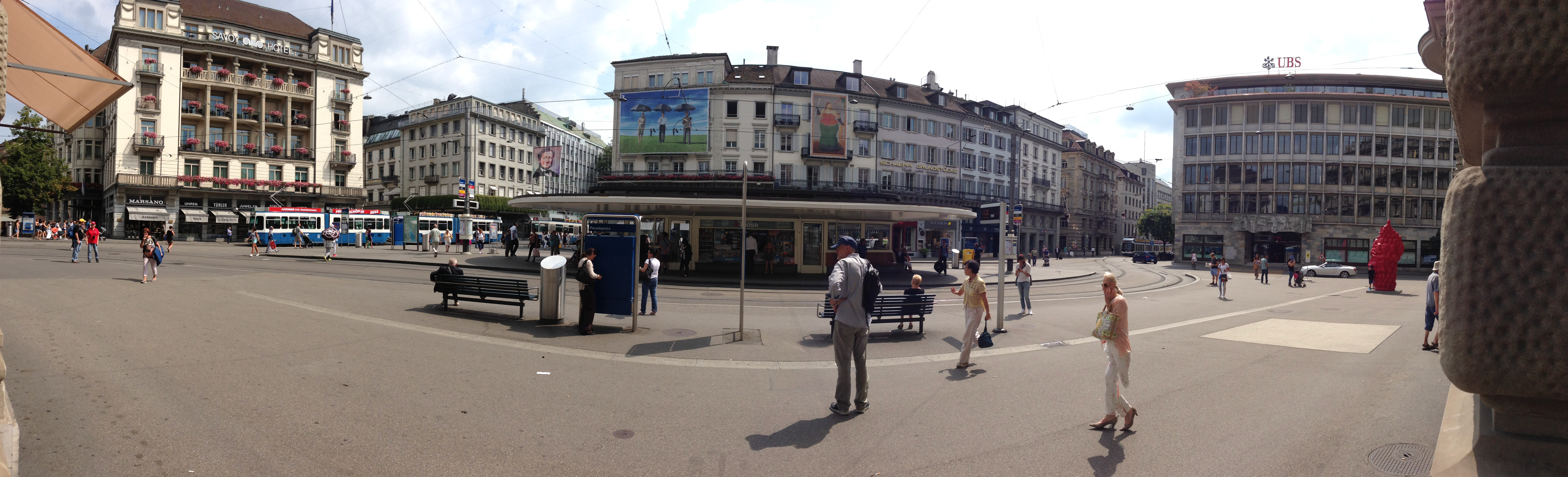
Paradeplatz in 2015, looking south from the Credit Suisse block. A number 11 tram is in view.

== See also ==
- Peterhof, a building on Bahnhofstrasse at the northeastern edge of Paradeplatz
