= Beat Arnold =

Swiss politician (1978–2021)

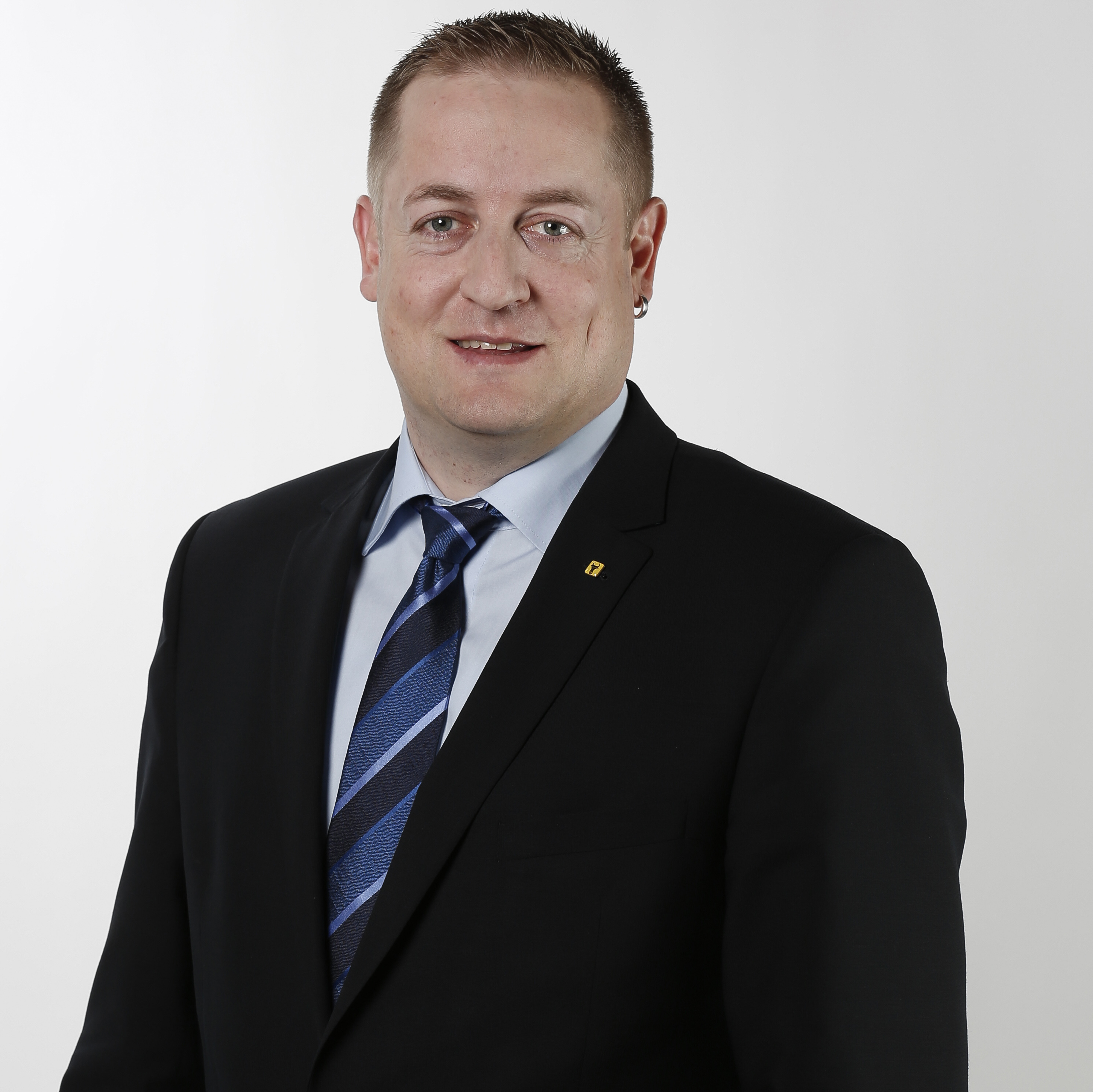
- Arnold in 2015

Member of the Swiss National Council
- In office 30 November 2015 – 2 December 2019

Member of the Executive Council of Uri
- In office August 2010 – May 2016

Member of the Landrat of Uri
- In office September 2006 – July 2010

Personal details
- Born: 24 April 1978 Altdorf, Switzerland
- Died: 10 October 2021 (aged 43) Lucerne, Switzerland
- Party: SVP

Beat Arnold (24 April 1978, Altdorf, Uri – 10 October 2021) was a Swiss politician. A member of the Swiss People's Party (SVP), he served on the National Council from 2015 to 2019. He also served in the Landrat of Uri from 2006 to 2010.

== Biography ==
Arnold was born in Altdorf on 24 April 1978 and moved to Unterschächen at a young age. He earned a degree in civil engineering from the Lucerne University of Applied Sciences and Arts in 2004 and earned a master's degree in economic sciences from the same school in 2009. He later earned a degree in consulting and personal development from the University of Salzburg in 2016.

Arnold worked as a construction foreman for Swiss Federal Railways from 2009 to 2010. After his term in the National Council, he returned to consulting. He was married and the father of five children, he lived in Schattdorf.

Beat Arnold died of a brain tumor in Lucerne on 10 October 2021, at the age of 43.

== Political career ==
Arnold served in the Landrat of Uri from September 2006 to July 2010. On 1 August 2008, he became the leader of the Swiss People's Party group within the Landrat. He then joined the Executive Council of Uri in August 2010, succeeding Markus Stadler. He stayed in office until May 2016 and headed the security department. He was the first SVP representative on the Executive Council. In 2015, he won a seat on the National Council, defeating candidates from the Christian Democratic People's Party of Switzerland and the Green Party of Switzerland. While in office, he led the Parliamentary Committee of Security Policy. In 2018, he underwent an operation to remove a brain tumor. He then announced that he would not seek re-election in 2019.
