= Schächental =

Valley in Switzerland

Coordinates: 46.864°N 8.761°E

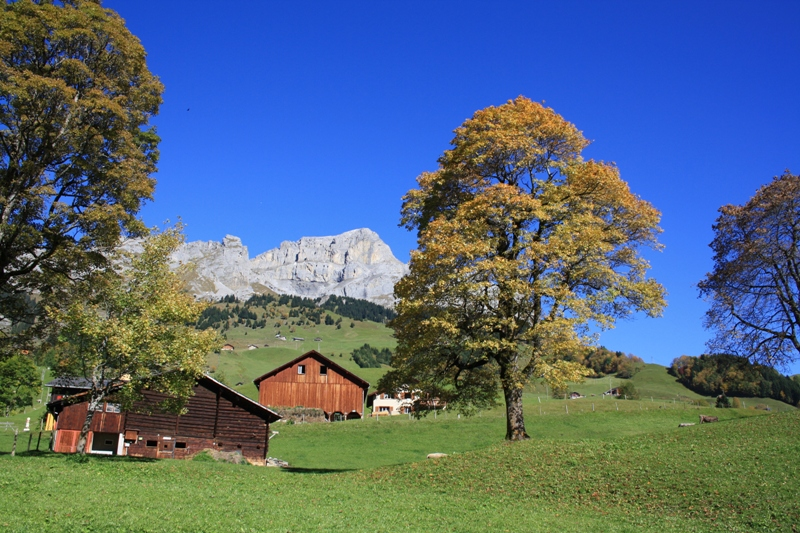
Autumn in Schächental

The Schächental (Schächen Valley) is an alpine valley of Uri, Switzerland, formed by the river Schächen. The valley stretches to the east of Altdorf for some 10 km.

Situated in the Schächental are the municipalities of Bürglen (525 m), Spiringen (923 m) and Unterschächen (995 m). The valley terminates in the Klausenpass (1948 m), which connects to the Urner Boden, leading towards Glarus. A side valley, the Brunnital branches to the south of Unterschächen, extending for some 4 km. It terminates abruptly, in the steep northern slope of the Gross Windgällen.

Upon leaving the valley, the Schächen flows past Altdorf and joins the Reuss at Attinghausen.

The inhabitants of the Schächen valley figure prominently in the formative phase of the Old Swiss Confederacy in the context of the struggle against the Habsburg feudal lords. According to Aegidius Tschudi (1570), William Tell was a native of the Schächen valley.

== See also ==
- List of valleys of the Alps
- List of rivers of Switzerland
