= Klausen Pass =

Mountain pass through the Swiss Alps

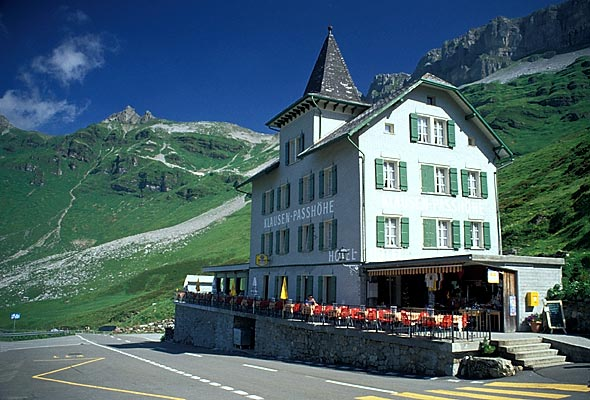
- Hotel Passhohe

- Location within Switzerland
- Elevation: 1,948 m (6,391 ft)
- Traversed by: Road

Location
- Location: Uri, Switzerland
- Range: Alps
- Coordinates: 46°52′05″N 08°51′20″E

Klausen Pass (German: Klausenpass; elevation: 1,948 metres or 6,391 feet) is a high mountain pass in the Swiss Alps connecting Altdorf in the canton of Uri with Linthal in the canton of Glarus. Somewhat unusually, the boundary between the two cantons does not lie at the summit of the pass, but some 8 kilometres (5.0 mi) down the slope towards Linthal, with the summit being in Uri.

The Klausen Pass is crossed by a paved road, which has a length, between Altdorf and Linthal, of 46 kilometres (29 mi). The road approaches the summit from Altdorf via the Schächen Valley communities of Bürglen, Spiringen and Unterschächen, and descends to Linthal via the Urnerboden. The road is normally closed between October and May, due to the high snowfall on the pass. During the open period, a PostBus Switzerland service crosses the pass several times a day, connecting Fluelen station, on the Gotthard railway and Lake Lucerne, with Linthal station, the terminus of the railway line through Glarus.

At the top of the pass is a historic chapel, the Bruder-Klaus-Kapelle, whilst 1,500 metres (4,900 ft) to the west side of, and 100 metres (330 ft) below, the summit is the Hotel Passhohe.

As well as being a popular route for cyclists and motorcyclists, the Klausenpass also forms part of the Alpine Pass Route, a long-distance hiking trail across Switzerland. However the hiking trail approaches the pass from both sides using a route different from that of the road.

== History ==
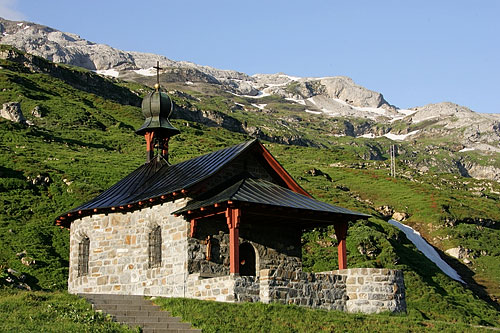
Bruder-Klaus-Kapelle

The Klausen Pass was originally a cattle track, which by 1196 was controlled by a customs office in Bürglen.

According to legend, the border between Glarus and Uri was determined in 1315, following prolonged disputes. The two cantons agreed that at first cockcrow, two runners would start from Altdorf and Linthal, respectively, and the border would be where they met. The people of Glarus decided to feed their cock well, so that it might be sympathetic to their cause, while the people of Uri gave theirs nothing to eat at all. The result was that the Glarus cock overslept, while the Uri one, driven by hunger, crowed exceptionally early, and the runner of Uri crossed the entire Urnerboden before the Glarus runner even set out. On the pleading of the Glarus runner, the man of Uri agreed to let him carry him back uphill as far as he could, and the present border between Uri and Glarus is where the Glarus runner fell dead, exhausted from carrying the runner from Uri.

In 1590, a hospital for travellers was built at Urnerboden, with the maintenance of the pass shared between the cantons of Uri and Glarus. In 1625 Glarus transferred their section of the route to a private individual. In 1717, a chapel was built at the summit, probably dedicated to Saint Nicholas of Myra. In 1870, a road was built from Altdorf to Unterschächen, and in 1893-1899 the road was extended across the pass to Linthal. The building of the road required the demolition of the 1717-built chapel, and the current Bruder-Klaus-Kapelle was built in 1938.

== Klausen hill climb ==
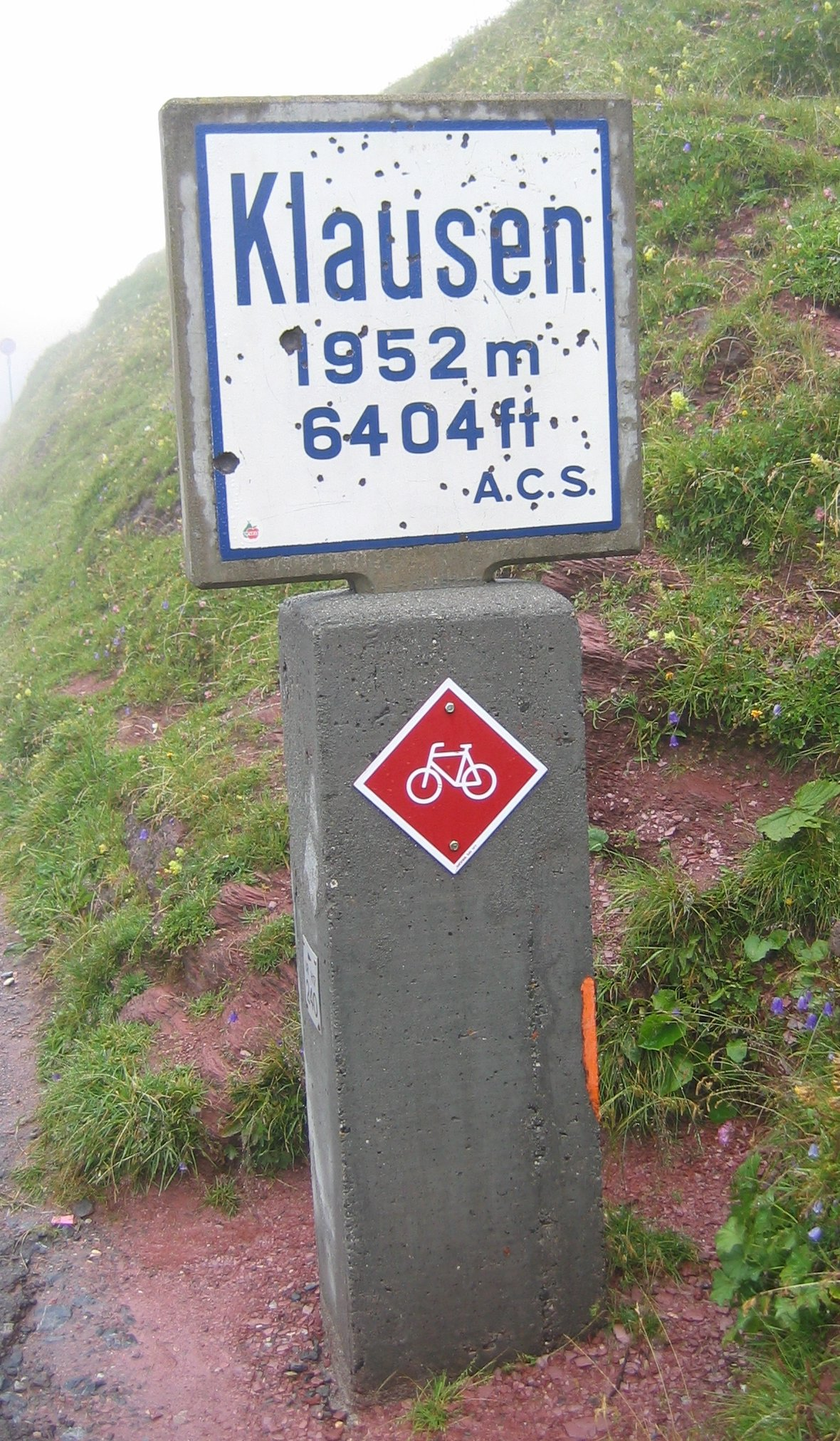
Klausenpass sign, with a slightly different elevation

An historic hillclimb, almost 14 miles long, known as the Klausenpassrennen. Whitney Straight finished third in the 1934 event.

1922 Nieth (Hispano Suiza) 21m 42s
1923 Rutzler (Steyr) 20m 24.4s
1924 Merz (Mercedes) 18m 48.6s
1925 Masetti (Sunbeam) 17m 28.8s
1927 Rosenberger (Mercedes) 17m 17s
1929 Chiron (Bugatti) 16m 42.4s
1930 Chiron (Bugatti) 16m 24.6s
1932 Caracciola (Alfa-Romeo) 15m 50s
1934 Caracciola (Mercedes) 15m 22.2s (record)

In 1993 the Klausenrennen memorial run took place, and is now held (nominally) every four years for vintage cars. The most recent event was held on 27–29 September 2013.

== See also ==
- List of highest paved roads in Switzerland
- List of highest road passes in Switzerland
- List of mountain passes in Switzerland
