= Urnerboden =

Urnerboden (village), Urner Boden (valley)
- Village, alp, valley
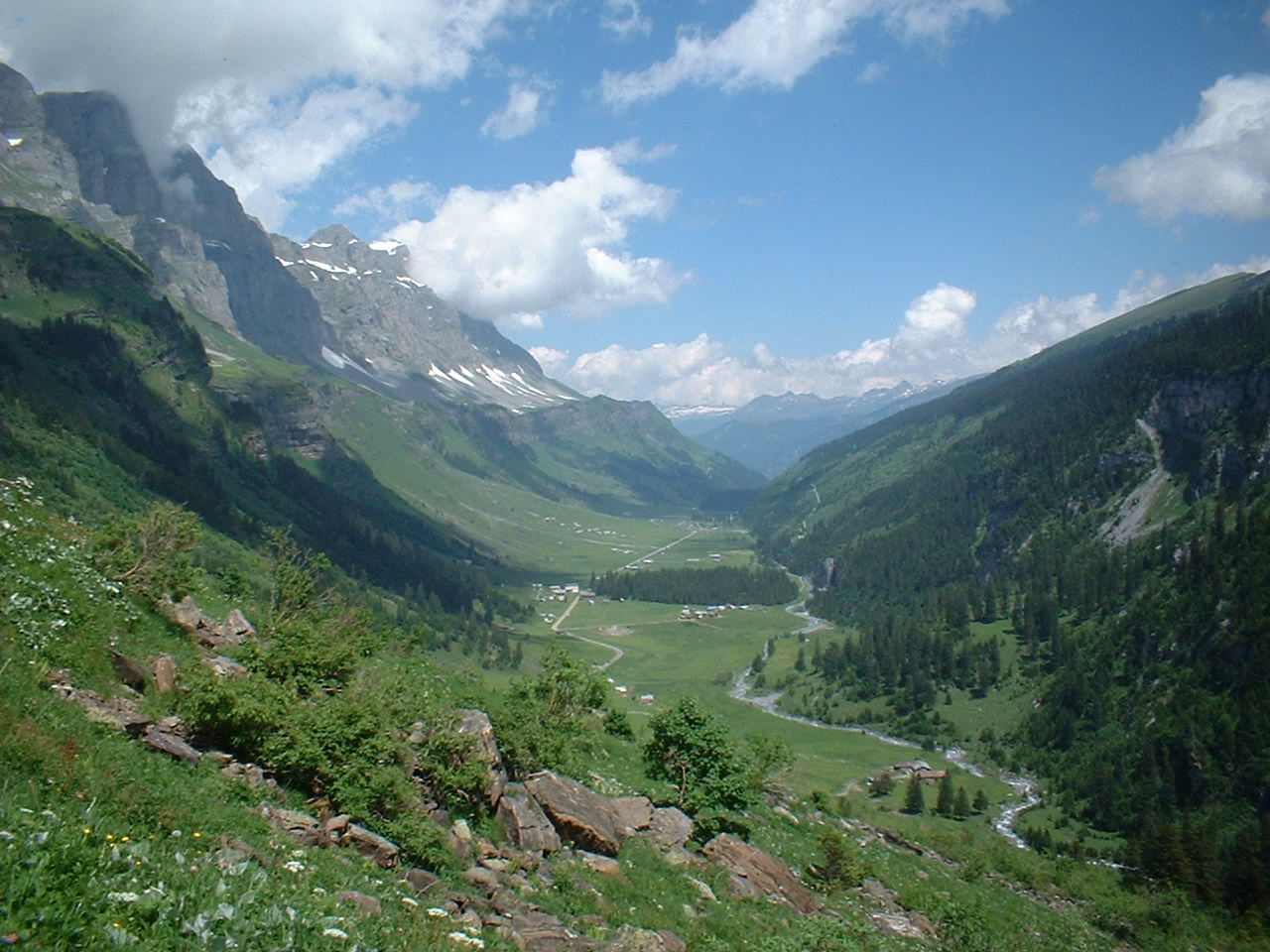
- Interactive map of Urnerboden (village), Urner Boden (valley)
- Coordinates: 46°53′24″N 8°54′2″E
- Country: Switzerland
- Canton: Uri
- Municipality: Spiringen

Dimensions
  - Length: 10 km (6.2 mi)
  - Width: 2.5 km (1.6 mi)
- Elevation: 1,383 m (4,537 ft)

Population (2003)
  - Total: 40
- Postal code: 8751
- Website: www.urnerboden.ch

The Urnerboden is a village in the high valley of Urner Boden, and also an alp and a small high Alpine permanent settlement in the Swiss canton of Uri. At 8 kilometres (5.0 mi) in length, it is believed to be the largest alp in Switzerland. It forms a disconnected part of the municipality of Spiringen, separated from the rump of that municipality by some 8 kilometres (5.0 mi) of the municipality of Unterschächen and by the Klausen Pass.

The Urner Boden is traversed by the eastern approach road to the Klausen Pass to the west, from the village of Linthal in the canton of Glarus. The Klausen Pass provides the only direct connection to the rest of the municipality of Spiringen and canton of Uri that lie to the west of the pass. The pass road is normally closed between October and May, and during this period the Urner Boden is only accessible from the east via Linthal, involving a road journey between the two halves of the municipality of some 126 kilometres (78 mi).

In summer, PostBus Switzerland operates a bus service which provides several daily return journeys to Linthal and Spiringen. Outside that period, a minibus service called the Urnerboden Sprinter provides three connections a day to Linthal.
