= Altdorf, Uri =

Altdorf
- Municipality
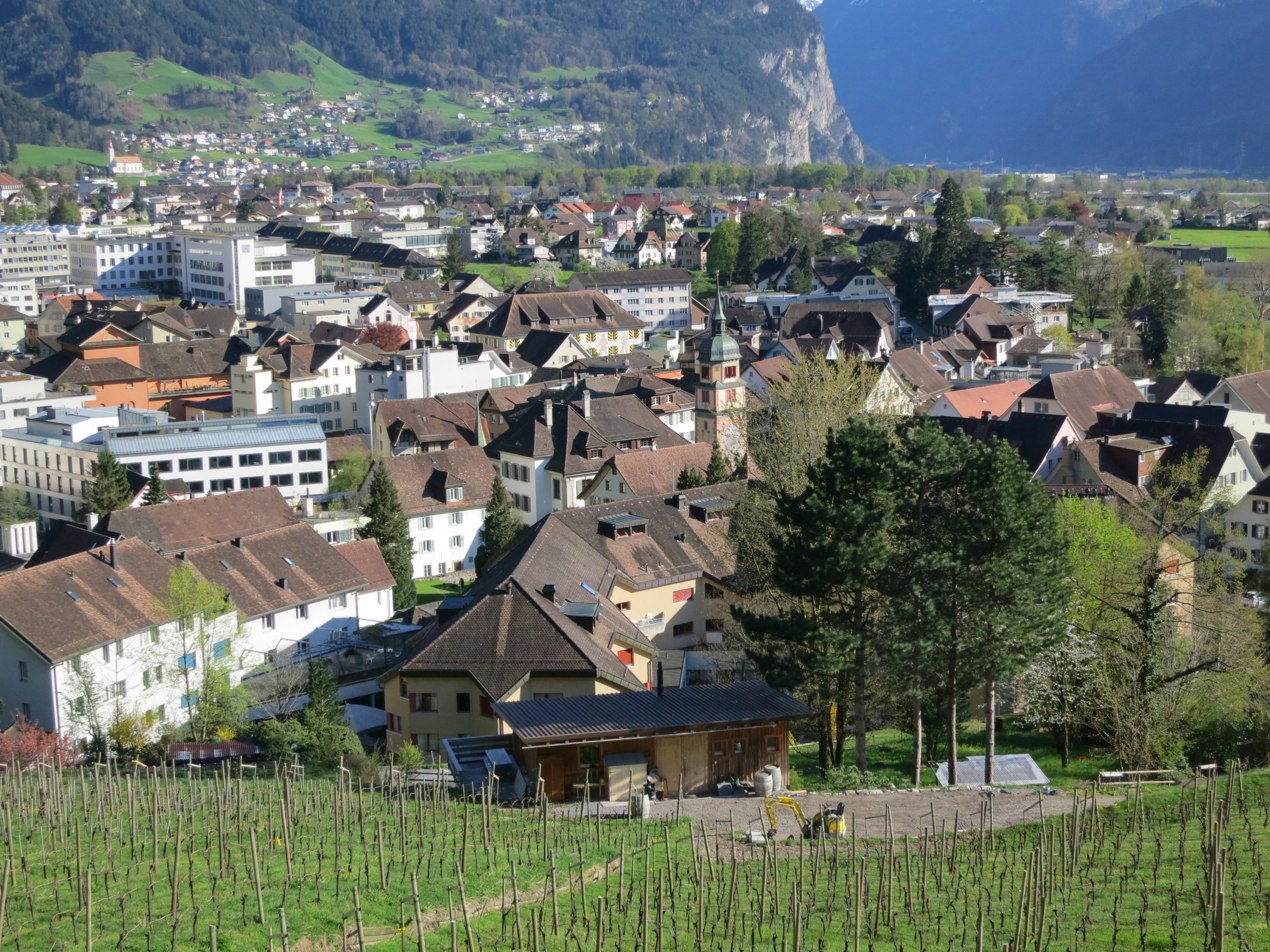

- Flag Coat of arms
- Location of Altdorf
- Location within Switzerland Location within Canton of Uri
- Coordinates: 46°52′N 8°38′E
- Country: Switzerland
- Canton: Uri
- District: n.a.

Government
  - Executive: Gemeinderat with 7 members
  - Mayor: Gemeindepräsident/in; Urs Kälin SPS/PSS
  - Parliament: none (Gemeindeversammlung)

Area
  - Total: 10.21 km^{2} (3.94 sq mi)
- Elevation (Church St. Martin): 458 m (1,503 ft)
- Highest elevation (Eggberge): 1,720 m (5,640 ft)
- Lowest elevation (Wildried): 432 m (1,417 ft)

Population (December 2020)
  - Total: 9,565
  - Density: 936.8/km^{2} (2,426/sq mi)
- Demonym: German: Altdorfer(in)
- Time zone: UTC+01:00 (CET)
  - Summer (DST): UTC+02:00 (CEST)
- Postal code: 6460
- SFOS number: 1201
- ISO 3166 code: CH-UR
- Surrounded by: Attinghausen, Bürglen, Flüelen, Seedorf
- Twin towns: Altdorf b. Nürnberg (Germany)
- Website: altdorf.ch

Altdorf (Swiss Standard German pronunciation: [ˈaltˌdɔrf]) is a municipality in Switzerland. It is the capital of the Swiss canton of Uri and retains historic town privileges. It is the place where, according to the legend, William Tell shot the apple from his son's head.

Altdorf is situated on the right (eastern) bank of the Reuss, about 2 kilometres (1.2 mi) south of where the river discharges into the Urnersee, an arm of Lake Lucerne. It is at the junction of two major Alpine passes—Saint Gotthard to the south and the Klausen Pass to the east—and is the last station on the Gotthard railway before the line enters the Gotthard Base Tunnel, the world's longest railway tunnel.

The official language of Altdorf is Swiss Standard German, but the main spoken language is the local variant of the Alemannic dialect.

== Geography ==
Aerial view from 400 m by Walter Mittelholzer (1922)

The municipality covers an area of 10.21 square kilometres (3.94 sq mi). The town proper (Note: Officially, Altdorf does not refer to itself as a town, but consistently uses the term Gemeinde, the German for 'municipality'.) sits at an altitude of 458 metres (1,503 ft) above sea level on a flat alluvial plain between the right bank of the river Reuss and the steep hillside of the Rossstock 2.4 km (1.5 mi) to the east. The scattered hamlets and pastureland of Eggbergen, about 1,000 metres (3,300 ft) above the town, also belong to the municipality.

Of Altdorf's total area, about 36% is used for agricultural purposes (predominately for orchards or vineyards), 37–39% is forested, 23% is settled (buildings or roads) and the remainder is rivers, glaciers, or mountains.

Altdorf adjoins the municipalities of Attinghausen and Seedorf across the Reuss to the west, Flüelen, the port village at the Urnersee to the north, Bürglen in the Schächental to the east and south, and Schattdorf to the south.

== History ==
=== Early settlement and medieval development ===
The earliest evidence of a settlement in Altdorf are several La Tène era bronze ax-heads and iron tools from the 3rd century BCE, along with iron implements recovered from the Bannwald above the Capuchin convent. The people that settled in this region initially settled in the forest, and expanded toward the banks of the Reuss. When the Reuss periodically flooded, the low lying settlements were destroyed and the inhabitants were driven back to the "old town", a possible source of the name Altdorf.

Following the collapse of the Roman Empire, the local Gallo-Roman population of Altdorf began to mix with the Germanic Alamanni during the 7th century. The earliest evidence of this cultural mixing is the grave of an armed horseman dated to 670–680, located in the local St Martin's Church. The current town was first mentioned in 1223 as Alttorf, whereas some sources from the 16th to 19th centuries occasionally refer to it as Uri.

By the second half of the 13th century, the territory around Altdorf had been cultivated to the banks of the Reuss. Beyond the main settlement of Altdorf itself, various hamlets are documented: Utzingen (1277), Hartolfingen, Magigen, and Untereien (1284). The Eggberge area was likely inhabited from the 14th century onward. The fertile lands to the west and south of the village were exploited intensively, while the Reuss valley remained largely as communal pasture. A substantial migration occurred, particularly of Walser people from Bosco/Gurin, continuing into the 17th century.

=== Economic development and urban growth ===
The economy of medieval Altdorf was shaped by an alternation between grain cultivation and pasture. In the late Middle Ages, cattle raising predominated over small livestock husbandry and cereal production. The region also cultivated grapevines, fruit trees, walnut trees, hemp, and vegetables, while fishing was also practiced. Around 1522, many villagers of Altdorf acquired exclusive rights to much of the communal lands, while the Bannwald forest remained collectively exploited for domestic needs. Forest management measures, applied from the 14th century and rigorously enforced by the 17th century, helped prevent landslides and avalanches.

The village developed from two nuclei: one near Saint Martin's Church, built during the early Middle Ages, which contained the homes of prebendaries and the Winterberg tower and hall that served as an administrative center for the Fraumünster of Zurich; and another to the east in the Gebreite, the probable location of the original market, featuring a justice linden tree first mentioned in 1257, a town hall documented in 1407, and a small tower (Türmli). The road from the Flüelen port branching near the town hall toward the Schmiedgasse (1437) and Hellgasse (1508) gave the village its distinctive three-branch structure. From the 16th to 18th centuries, families of magistrates and officers with foreign military service established themselves along the roads to Flüelen, Bürglen, and Schattdorf.

Several major fires destroyed portions of Altdorf in 1400, 1693, and 1799. Following the 1693 fire, the municipal authorities widened and straightened the streets, though most houses were rebuilt in wood with shingle roofs weighted down by heavy stones. Only after the 1799 fire did the municipality mandate the use of stone and tile.

From the 13th century onward, numerous merchants and artisans operated in Altdorf. A 1553 regulation documents 32 different trades. Urban-style guilds were unknown in Altdorf. Built by the early 14th century at the latest, the Dorfbach canal supplied water to residents and businesses, powered mill wheels, sawmills, and other operations, and provided a means to dispose of wastewater.

Although the exact date is unknown, Altdorf received a market, though without special privileges. Weekly and annual fairs, documented from the 15th century, ensured regular regional supply of both locally-produced and imported goods. The town served as a way-station for wine, livestock, cheese, grain, and salt en route to and from the Gotthard Pass. The importance of the pass drove growth in water transport and mule transport from the late Middle Ages, while military service abroad became an important source of income for certain entrepreneur families.

=== Religious institutions ===
In 853, King Louis II of Germany granted the Pagellus Uroniae (land of Uri) to the Fraumünster of Zurich, making the people of Altdorf serfs of the monastery, obligated to pay tithes. While maintaining their own lands, they also cultivated monastic and prebendary properties in exchange for dues. From the 13th century, various noble families such as the Rapperswil, Utzingen, d'Asuel, Schauensee, Attinghausen, and la Tour are documented in Altdorf, whether residing there or holding property. Most of these families died out in Uri during the 13th and 14th centuries. During the 13th century, various land rights belonging to nobles passed to monasteries such as Wettingen Abbey. The mayors and administrators (Ammanns) of ecclesiastical territories enjoyed enviable social and economic positions. The redemption of Fraumünster rights by the Uri population in 1359 and the transfer of Fraumünster tithes to Altdorf in 1428 significantly advanced the equality of parishioners. In the late Middle Ages and early modern period, common residents increasingly claimed rights to the detriment of non-landowning inhabitants. During the 16th and 17th centuries, Uri's magistrate and officer families formed an increasingly closed social caste, with nearly all residing in Altdorf by the 17th century, coming to dominate the town's political, economic, and cultural life.

The oldest witness to Christianization is a church dedicated to Saint Martin of Tours built around 670–680. Beyond Altdorf, the parish encompassed Erstfeld, Attinghausen, and all settlements on the shores of Lake Uri. There is no doubt that the 853 donation to Fraumünster included St Martin's Church with its tithes and associated prebendal lands. The bishop's patronage was exercised by the abbess, who obtained full incorporation from the Bishop of Constance in 1244. Besides the beneficiaries and priests designated by the abbess – records of whom exist from 1225 onward – vicars are documented from the 13th century. In 1317, a benefice – or prebend – for the Frühmesser ('first mass' or 'early mass') celebrant, known as the benefice of Liebfrauen ('Our Lady') was established. In 1428, the choice of priest passed from the abbess of Fraumünster to the parishioners themselves. By voluntarily renouncing its right of appointment in 1525, the Council of Zurich effectively established the Altdorf parishioners as ecclesiastical patrons. Between 1548 and 1785, nine additional family prebends were created through various donations. Since 1387, nine parishes have separated from the Altdorf parish.

The influence of Cardinal Charles Borromeo enabled the Catholic Counter-Reformation to establish a foothold in Altdorf. The Capuchin convent – the monastery of All Saints – was founded in 1581, followed by a Franciscan convent near the Upper Cross in 1677. Baroque spirituality gave rise to several religious confraternities, the most distinctive being the 17th-century Vita devota Altorfensis or Devotio Michelina, a movement of mystical piety. Between 1542 and 1731, eight papal nuncios and two ambassadors of Spain resided in Altdorf. In response to ecclesiastical authority, parishioners demonstrated firm attachment to local prerogatives.

The first Saint Martin's Church (initially a single-nave structure) was replaced in the 9th or 10th century by a new building with two side aisles, which was then supplanted, probably in the 14th century, by a substantial Gothic construction. In the early 17th century, this underwent transformation in the style of the Renaissance and early Baroque. Following the 1799 village fire, the church was reconstructed in neoclassical style. Altdorf's sacred landscape is further enriched by the Chapel of St. James (1570), the ossuary (1596), the Zwyer Chapel (1599), the Saint Charles Chapel at the Upper Cross (dedicated circa 1615), the Lower Chapel of the Holy Cross built after the 1629 plague, and the Chapel of the Mount of Olives (1657).

Religious confraternities and pious societies appeared from the 15th century onward; of somewhat varying character and sometimes encompassing multiple villages, many have partially survived to the present day. The first mention of a schoolmaster, Johannes Bürgler, dates to 1472. The oldest known school regulations date from 1579. Altdorf's school, where Latin was taught, had a cantonal character. It staged performances whose tradition extends back to at least 1512, with William Tell. From 1697/1704, girls were able to attend the school of the Franciscan convent. The ruling classes cultivated a refined lifestyle from the 16th century onward, reflected in the residence of the Jauch family with its stepped gable in late Gothic style (circa 1550) and the richly decorated Eselmätteli house (17th–18th centuries). The Church was no exception, as evidenced by the impressive treasure of Saint Martin, to which various Altdorf goldsmiths contributed.

=== Governance and municipal institutions ===
The community of villagers first appears in 1366 regarding ancient usage rights and commons in the Bannwald. The redemption of rights belonging to Fraumünster of Zurich in 1428 significantly strengthened the municipality. Protocols document municipal affairs from 1522 onward. The secretary Johann Jakob Püntener synthesized these into a "booklet" in 1684 that served as Altdorf's constitution. The supreme authority was held by the assembly of communal members, which excluded simple residents. The tribunal, predecessor of the municipal council (executive), consisted of the village bailiff, treasurer, six other members, the secretary, and the sexton. Various officials, the most important being the parish administrator, ensured proper community functioning.

A hospital for travelers and the poor, founded in 1437, was rebuilt by the municipality around 1551 and endowed in 1584 with a perpetual income for poor relief. It provided lodging and medical care to local sick and especially to suffering and needy travelers. In 1636, Altdorf opened a leper house near the Chapel of St. James. From the 16th century at the latest, community members had access to the baths of Moosbad. Most households obtained potable water from five public fountains, nearly all built in the second half of the 16th century. Several private residences had running water. Altdorf enjoyed special rights to cantonal goods (gardens, enclosed pastures, forests with or without harvesting rights) and, along with Attinghausen and Erstfeld, administered the alpine pasture of Rinderhirte at Surenen. Efforts to control flooding of the Reuss and Schächen fell to corporations that the municipality subsidized and whose leadership it appointed. At night, the "Föhnwache" a patrol of lookouts, guarded against fires; a statute of 1631 renewed the Föhnwache, revising its regulation. Following the 1693 fire, the municipality constructed a special guard post near the Capuchin convent.

Within the canton of Uri, Altdorf formed a consortium and a half, providing it nine delegates to the Council of Sixty. Its preponderance was more pronounced in the executive branch, where Altdorf families held nearly all major cantonal offices between 1650 and 1847. This resulted in tensions between the cantonal capital and the rural communities that intensified notably in the late 18th century. At that time, members of the old military aristocracy and enriched merchants opened themselves to the ideas of the Enlightenment and rallied to the Helvetic Republic.

In 1913, Altdorf's municipality, parish, and bourgeoisie separated. Since Altdorf was frequently over-represented in cantonal government, the 1888 cantonal constitution limited state council seats for residents of any single municipality to three. The Société du Grütli was founded in 1881, the progressive-democratic group (forerunner of the Radical Democratic Party) in 1892, the local section of the conservative party in 1900/1901 (now the Christian Democratic People's Party), and the Socialist Party section in 1908. On the labor and union front, the Altdorf artisans and merchants association and surroundings (1886), sections of the Industry, Construction and Services Trade Union (FTMH, 1916), the Christian Federation of Wood and Building Workers (1927) and Christian Federation of Metal Workers (1932), and the Christian Transport Union of Altdorf/Flüelen (1941) were established.

=== Infrastructure and transportation developments ===
Improvements in transportation—a passable road by 1830, the Gotthard Railways in 1882, and the Flüelen-Erstfeld motorway section in 1973—reduced Altdorf's importance as a way-station and market, but favored its industrial development.

The cultivable land was expanded through embankment of the Reuss (1850–1863) and land improvement in the plain (1919–1924). The system of crop and pasture alternation gained further importance; a livestock breeders' association was founded in 1906, a dairy cooperative in 1919, and livestock insurance in 1910. Until the opening of the Gotthard railway, several small craft enterprises along the Dorfbach canal met regional needs. A large number of home workers spun cotton or processed silk for entrepreneurs from Gersau and elsewhere. The opening of the railway line (1882) and the Altdorf electrical power station (1895) led to the creation of various specialized industrial enterprises, nearly all focused on textile and wood products. However, most did not survive; among those that persisted were the Federal Munitions Factory (1895, later SM Swiss Munitions Enterprise, operating until 2007) and Dätwyler AG (1915, cables, rubber products, flooring). Other important firms included the ribbon factory Streiff (1945) and Merck & Cie KG (1969, chemistry and pharmaceuticals).

Convenient access roads—the Axenstrasse in 1864 and the Klausen Pass in 1900—promoted the development of the hotel industry. The Eggberge area developed into a vacation and winter sports destination through a cable car (1955). Retail shops, banks, insurance companies, and cantonal administrative offices concentrated in Altdorf, making it a regional center.

Since 1888, Altdorf has maintained a reliable water supply network. Control of Reuss and Schächen flooding gradually became the canton's responsibility. In the Bannwald, following 19th-century stabilization work against landslides, access roads and protective structures were recently constructed in parallel. Altdorf obtained the telegraph in 1853 and its first telephone network in 1884; in 1902–1904, the Confederation constructed a new post office at Landleutematte. In 1964, the Altdorf regional wastewater treatment plant was completed, and in 1969, that of Eggberge.

=== Social and cultural development ===
After 1800, society experienced few unbridgeable barriers. Only residents lacking citizenship rights—primarily servants and certain artisans—were practically excluded from advancement until the 19th century's end. Nevertheless, even after the Helvetic Republic, the upper class consisted almost exclusively of the old military aristocracy that had served abroad under the Ancien Régime and maintained great influence through its financial lending capacity, though it generally lacked entrepreneurial spirit. By mid-19th century, this group was gradually displaced by prosperous businessmen, forwarding agents, merchants, and hoteliers. University-educated individuals (lawyers, engineers, physicians) also accessed leadership positions, joined in the 20th century by industrial and craft representatives and cantonal administrative officials. The middle class comprised civil servants, prosperous artisans, muletiers (until 1882), and farmers, joined in the 20th century by small merchants and employees. The lower class, quantitatively the largest, had suffered 18th-century subsistence crises. It then encompassed small farmers, day laborers, and apprentices. Under the Helvetic Republic, ruinous quartering demands and the devastating 1799 fire cast many into misery. In the early 19th century, one-sixth of the Uri population, including many Altdorf residents, depended on public assistance. The decline of home work, frequent flooding, and transport modernization—disadvantaging muletiers and small haulers—after the 1830 opening of the Gotthard road delayed improvement in their circumstances until mid-century. In 1843, 292 people (15.3%) required assistance in Altdorf; by 1890, this had declined to 220 (7.5%). Only with industrialization did the disadvantaged class achieve relatively secure living conditions after 1900.

Organizations and cooperatives played a significant role in socio-economic affairs. A sick care society and children's soup kitchen appeared in 1880; the Altdorf and surroundings consumer cooperative was founded in 1906, followed two years later by Pro Altdorf, an organization defending small artisans against large retailers, then by the Catholic dispensary in 1913, the Pro Familia housing construction cooperative in 1945, and finally the Protestant dispensary in 1958. Neighborhood associations were established in the Lehn (1783, reorganized in 1888) and Hellgasse (1856).

School buildings were constructed at Josefsplatz in 1811, at Station Road in 1915, and at Hagen and near the franciscan convent after World War II. The Marianists ran the boys' school from 1846 to 1974. The Sisters of Menzingen have taught in Altdorf since 1862; the same year saw the opening of secondary school. Business circles created professional advancement courses in 1883 and a commercial school in 1911. The cantonal college Charles-Borromeo was founded in 1906.

Beyond pastoral duties, the clergy heavily engaged in social and educational activities. Numerous religious associations emerged from the late 19th century onward. The Eggberge Chapel was built in 1968, and the Church of St. Nicholas of Flüe in 1969. Since 1911, Protestants have celebrated regular services in Altdorf; they constructed their church and parish house in 1924. They have belonged since 1885 to the new Reformed parish of Uri and manage their own budget.

In cultural matters, notable are the steady practice of sacred and brass band music and choral singing from the early 19th century onward. The monument to William Tell, sculpted by Richard Kissling, was inaugurated in 1895. The society of the Play of Wilhelm Tell was founded in 1898. The Leuzinger cinema played an important role beginning in 1925.

A printing operation first functioned continuously in Altdorf from 1826. Principal newspapers included the Wochenblatt von Uri (1838–1848), the Amtsblatt des Kantons Uri (1849), the Urner Wochenblatt (1875), the Gotthard-Post (1892), and Alternative (1973). Located from 1867 to 1915 in the current Tellspielhaus on Schützengasse, the municipal building now stands on the plaza bearing its name.

The travelers' hospital lost importance after the cantonal hospital's opening in 1872; it merged with the poor fund in 1878. In 1805, private circles created an institution for poor relief, which built a large reception home in 1848. The municipality took it over in 1853, transforming it in 1982 into the regional Rosenberg retirement home.

The municipality participated in financing the Moosbad swimming pool, operated since 1978.

== Demographics ==
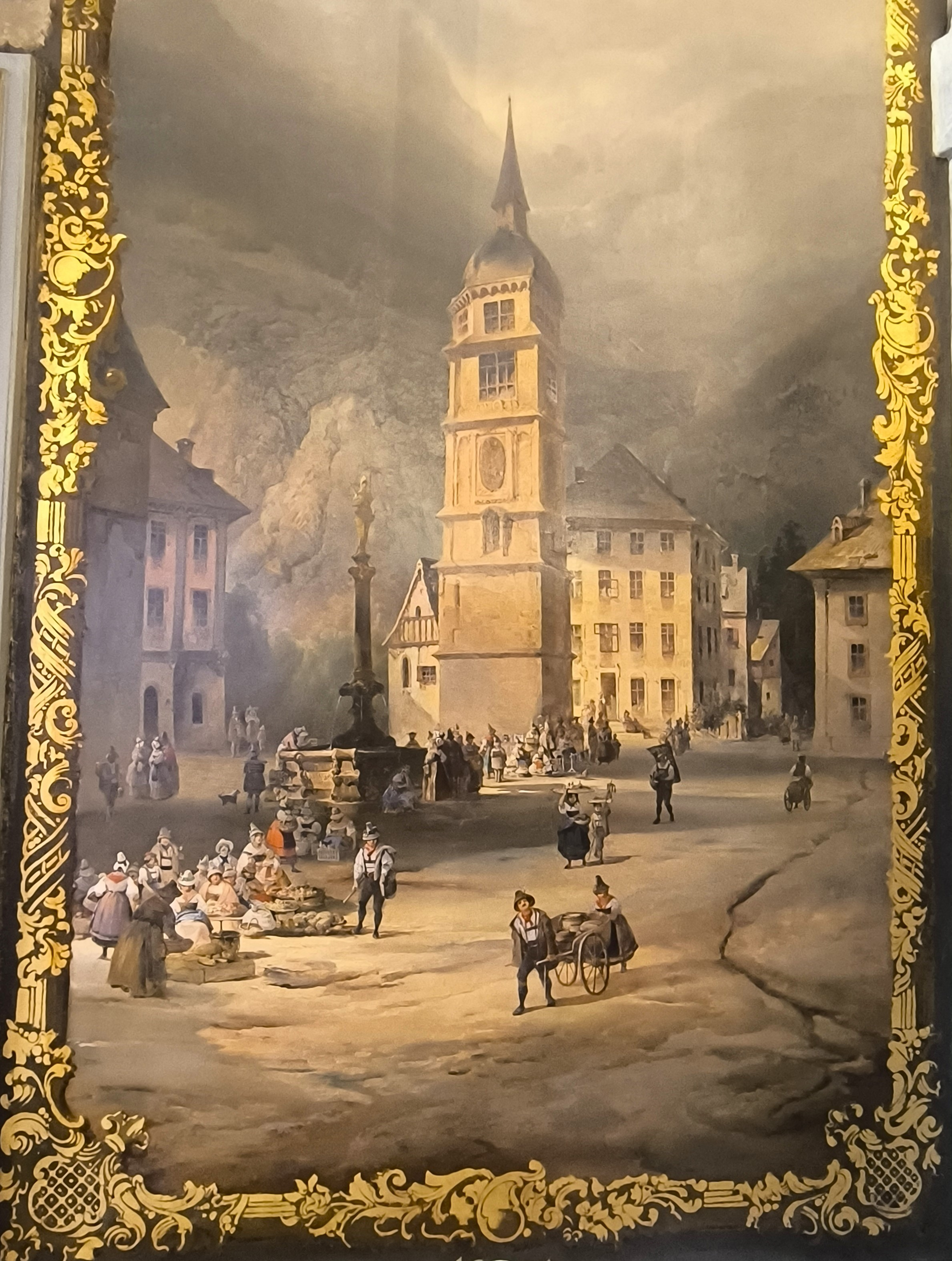
Altdorf in 1847, Josef Navrátil painting in Prague, House Nr. 1239-II.

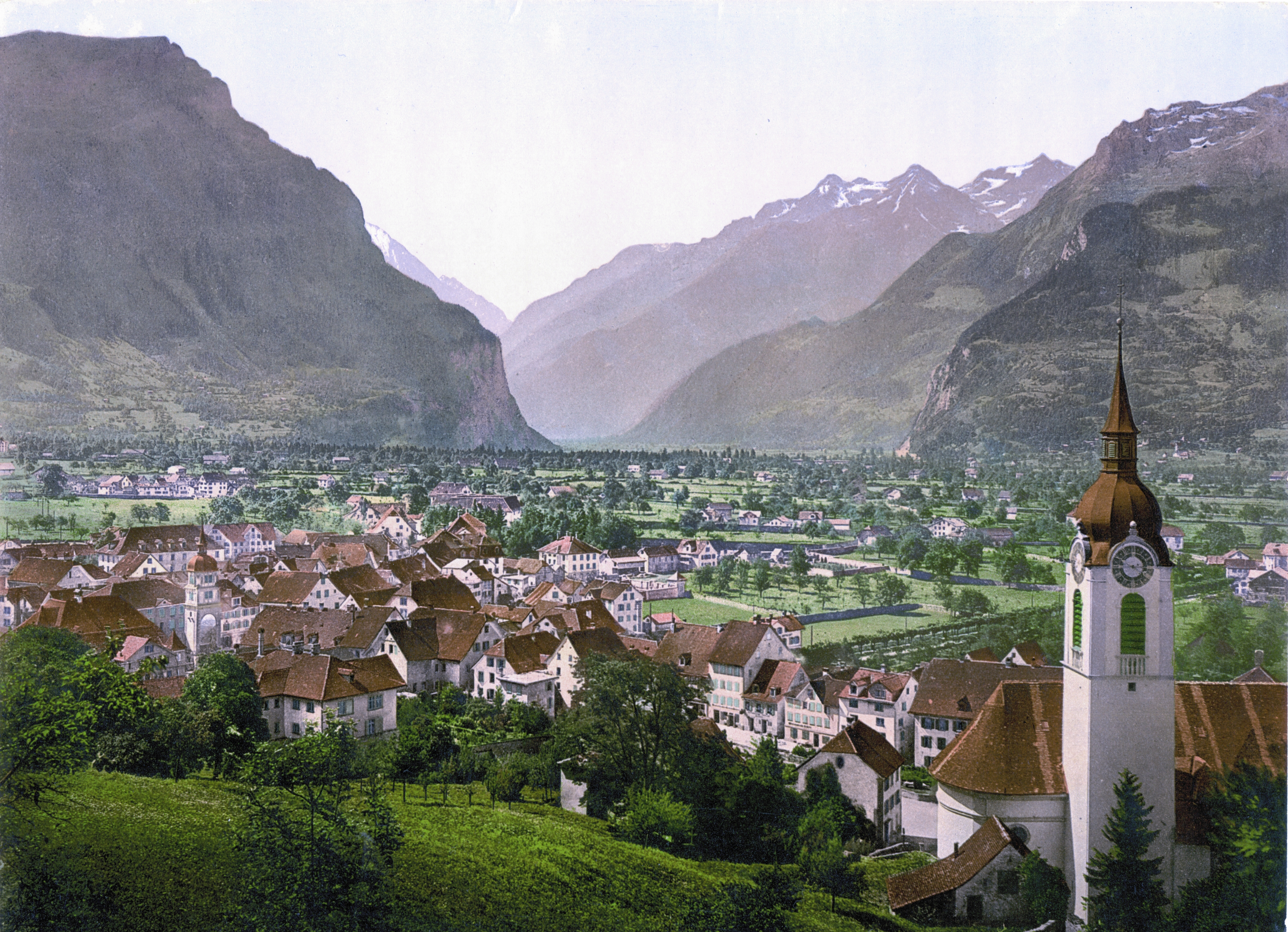
Altdorf, 1900.

Altdorf has a population (as of 31 December 2020) of 9,565. As of 2017, 1,347 people or 14.8% of the population was made up of foreign nationals. From 2008 through 2017 the population has increased at an annual rate of 0.8%. Most of the population (as of 2000) speaks German (88.3%), with Serbo-Croatian being second most common (4.2%) and Italian being third ( 2.5%). As of 2007 the gender distribution of the population was 48.4% male and 51.6% female.

In Altdorf about 65.2% of the population (between age 25–64) have completed either non-mandatory upper secondary education or additional higher education (either university or a Fachhochschule).

=== Employment ===
Altdorf has an unemployment rate of 1.45%. As of 2005, there were 137 people employed in the primary economic sector and about 49 businesses involved in this sector. 1,748 people are employed in the secondary sector and there are 77 businesses in this sector. 3,585 people are employed in the tertiary sector, with 403 businesses in this sector.

The primary sector provided 17% of jobs in 1930, but only 3% and 2% in 1980 and 1990 respectively. The secondary sector (53% in 1930) declined later: 52% in 1980, 39% in 1990, while the tertiary sector grew: 30% in 1930, 45% in 1980, 59% in 1990.

=== Historical population ===
year	population	Swiss citizens	% German Speaking	% Roman Catholic
1600	c. 3,100			
1629	c. 1,500			
1650	c. 3,000			
1743	3,025			
1799	c. 2,000			
1837	1,903			
1850	2,112	2,088		
1880	2,906	2,734	97.9%	96.0%
1910	3,854	3,515	94.2%	93.6%
1930	4,240	3,984	94.7%	92.0%
1950	6,576	6,236	94.5%	88.7%
1970	8,647	7,659	89.7%	89.4%
1990	8,282	7,158	88.0%	84.3%
Source: Historical Dictionary of Switzerland

French occupation in the late 18th century caused lasting demographic shock; the population did not return to 1799 levels until the mid-19th century. From that point forward, population grew rapidly due to economic development, which attracted labor principally from other Uri municipalities. The construction of the Gotthard railway (1872–1882) brought new immigrants from central Switzerland and especially Italy. After the railway's completion, industrial growth maintained this immigration, while the native population remained stagnant.

In the late 19th century, Altdorf still presented the appearance of a closed village. In 1834, it contained 153 buildings, most of stone; by 1900, it had 351 houses with 665 households and approximately 250 rural buildings. The railway station road (1880) and the Altdorf-Flüelen tram line (1906) connected the village center to rail stations. After 1900, the settlement developed along access roads. Around 1900, many still owned homes with gardens, but during the 20th century, the proportion of renters steadily increased. In 1950, Altdorf contained 701 buildings with 1,471 apartments and 1,498 households. The settlement lacks clear divisions between residential, artisanal, and industrial zones. By the late 20th century, shops and offices tended to displace residences from the village center. Modern building regulations were promulgated in 1942; a zoning plan followed in 1975.

== Sights ==
=== Tell Monument ===
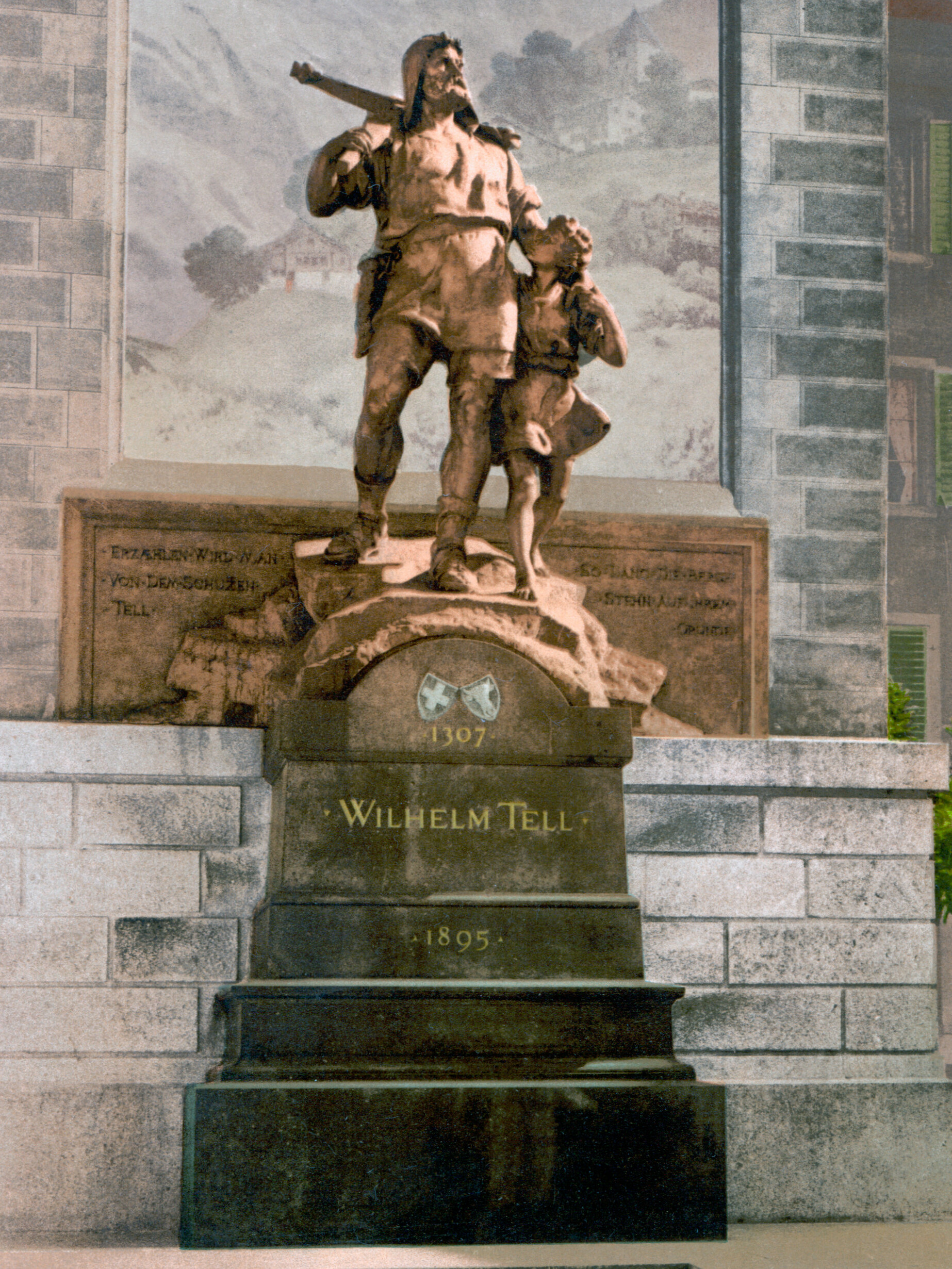
Wilhelm Tell memorial in Altdorf, c. 1900.

According to the legend, Altdorf's marketplace is the site where William Tell shot the apple from his son's head, and in 1895 sculptor Richard Kissling unveiled a bronze statue commemorating the feat at the foot of an old tower.

In 1899 a theatre was opened close to the town's center for the purpose of performing Schiller's play of Wilhelm Tell.

=== Historisches Museum and the Haus für Kunst Uri ===
In 1905 a Museum was opened on Gottardstrasse just south of the centre of the town that houses a collection of local antiquities, weapons and regional furniture, as well as a collection of portraits of important Uri citizens, including fine ones by the Andermatt-born Felix Maria Diogg (1762–1834). There are several paintings here by the Swiss-born American artist Adolfo Müller-Ury (1862–1947) whose family came from Hospental, including portraits of Pope Pius X, Pope Pius XI, Cardinal Merry del Val, the artist's father Alois Muller, his uncle Domherr Josef Muller, and a large allegorical work Alpenrose und Edelweiss. The museum was extended in the 1990s.

Recently the town has established the Haus für Kunst Uri at Herrengasse 2 in a partly converted historic house with a large contemporary extension creating an attractive exhibition space. The work of Swiss and international contemporary artists from Uri is exhibited here, and they sometimes have exhibitions of earlier historical art.

== Climate ==
Between 1961 and 1990 Altdorf had an average of 133.7 days of rain per year and on average received 1,099 mm (43.3 in) of precipitation. The wettest month was August during which time Altdorf received an average of 135 mm (5.3 in) of precipitation. During this month there was precipitation for an average of 13.2 days. The month with the most days of precipitation was June, with an average of 14.4, but with only 127 mm (5.0 in) of precipitation. The driest month of the year was February with an average of 66 mm (2.6 in) of precipitation over 13.2 days. According to the Köppen Climate Classification system, Altdorf is classified as Cfb, or Marine West Coast Climate.

Climate data for Altdorf, elevation 438 m (1,437 ft), (1991–2020)
Month	Jan	Feb	Mar	Apr	May	Jun	Jul	Aug	Sep	Oct	Nov	Dec	Year
Mean daily maximum °C (°F)	5.0 (41.0)	6.4 (43.5)	10.8 (51.4)	15.0 (59.0)	19.3 (66.7)	22.4 (72.3)	24.1 (75.4)	23.6 (74.5)	19.4 (66.9)	14.9 (58.8)	9.1 (48.4)	5.4 (41.7)	14.6 (58.3)
Daily mean °C (°F)	1.6 (34.9)	2.4 (36.3)	6.1 (43.0)	9.9 (49.8)	14.0 (57.2)	17.3 (63.1)	18.9 (66.0)	18.5 (65.3)	14.7 (58.5)	10.7 (51.3)	5.7 (42.3)	2.3 (36.1)	10.2 (50.4)
Mean daily minimum °C (°F)	−2.1 (28.2)	−1.8 (28.8)	1.1 (34.0)	4.4 (39.9)	8.6 (47.5)	12.0 (53.6)	13.7 (56.7)	13.4 (56.1)	9.9 (49.8)	6.3 (43.3)	1.8 (35.2)	−1.3 (29.7)	5.5 (41.9)
Average precipitation mm (inches)	69.9 (2.75)	59.2 (2.33)	72.2 (2.84)	81.0 (3.19)	117.3 (4.62)	138.1 (5.44)	140.6 (5.54)	153.6 (6.05)	105.3 (4.15)	84.2 (3.31)	81.2 (3.20)	83.4 (3.28)	1,186 (46.69)
Average snowfall cm (inches)	12.6 (5.0)	11.2 (4.4)	4.4 (1.7)	1.9 (0.7)	0.0 (0.0)	0.0 (0.0)	0.0 (0.0)	0.0 (0.0)	0.0 (0.0)	0.7 (0.3)	4.1 (1.6)	9.7 (3.8)	44.6 (17.6)
Average precipitation days (≥ 1.0 mm)	9.2	8.6	9.7	9.8	12.1	14.1	14.1	13.3	10.2	8.7	9.4	10.0	129.2
Average snowy days (≥ 1.0 cm)	3.1	2.7	1.3	0.2	0.0	0.0	0.0	0.0	0.0	0.1	1.0	2.4	10.8
Average relative humidity (%)	78	74	70	66	69	73	74	76	78	79	79	80	75
Mean monthly sunshine hours	48.9	82.6	123.7	143.3	153.5	160.2	168.7	158.5	136.2	107.4	56.5	36.7	1,376.2
Percentage possible sunshine	36	42	47	51	45	46	48	52	52	46	36	30	46
Source 1: NOAA
Source 2: MeteoSwiss

== International relations ==
=== Twin towns – sister cities ===
Altdorf is twinned with:

- Altdorf bei Nürnberg, Germany (since 1971)

== Transport ==
Altdorf is served by the regional public transport hub of Altdorf railway station, situated within the municipality and on the Gotthard railway. In 1899 a carriage-road was opened from Altdorf through the Schächental and over the Klausen Pass (1,948 metres (6,391 ft)) to the village of Linthal (46 kilometres (29 mi)) and so to Glarus. In 1906, the Altdorf–Flüelen tramway was constructed to connect the centre of Altdorf with Fluelen railway station. The electric tramway operated until 1951, when it was replaced by a bus service.

== Notable people ==
- Sebastian Peregrin Zwyer (1597–1661) was a Swiss military commander, mercenary entrepreneur, and one of the foremost politicians of the Old Swiss Confederacy; died in Altdorf
- Franz Vital Lusser (1849–1927), Swiss civil engineer
- Henry Haller (born 1923 in Altdorf, Uri) a retired Chef who served as Executive Chef at the White House for 22 years
- Beat Streuli (born 1957 in Altdorf, Uri) a Swiss visual artist who works with photo and video based media
- Luzia Zberg (born 1970 in Altdorf, Uri) a retired racing cyclist
- Beat Zberg (born 1971 in Altdorf, Uri) a Swiss former professional road bicycle racer
- Matthias Simmen (born 1972 in Altdorf, Uri) a retired Swiss biathlete, he competed in the 2002, 2006 and 2010 Winter Olympics
- Markus Zberg (born 1974 in Altdorf, Uri) a retired Swiss professional road bicycle racer

== See also ==
- List of towns in Switzerland
- List of municipalities of Switzerland
- Municipalities of the canton of Uri

== Notes and references ==
=== Bibliography ===
- Müller, Carl Franz (ed.): Das Dorfbüchlein des Fleckens Altdorf. Gesetze und Ordnungen für Altdorf. Durch Johann Jakob Büntiner, 1954.
- Ammann, Hektor: "Die Talschaftshauptorte der Innerschweiz in der mittelalterlichen Wirtschaft", in: Der Geschichtsfreund. Mitteilungen des Historischen Vereins der fünf Orte Luzern, Uri, Schwyz, Unterwalden ob und nid dem Wald und Zug, 102, 1949, pp. 105–144.
- Müller, Carl Franz: Das Bürgerhaus im Kanton Uri, 1950².
- Stadler, Johann: "Landammann und Ständerat Gustav Muheim (1851–1917) von Altdorf. Ein Beispiel konservativer Politik um die Jahrhundertwende", in: Historisches Neujahrsblatt Uri, new series, 26/27, 1971/1972, pp. 1–258.
- Bielmann, Jürg: Die Lebensverhältnisse im Urnerland während des 18. und zu Beginn des 19. Jahrhunderts, 1972.
- Fryberg, Stefan: Untersuchungen über die historische Demographie im Kanton Uri im 19. Jahrhundert, thesis, University of Basel, 1977.
- Stadler, Martin; Bachmann, Heinrich: Altdorf. 100 Jahre aus dem Leben eines Dorfes und eines Vereins, 1978.
- Zurfluh, Anselm: "Die Einwohnerzahl Altdorfs und des Kantons Uri von 1600 bis 1830", in: Historisches Neujahrsblatt Uri, new series, 37/38, 1982/1983, pp. 101–111.
- Inventaire suisse d'architecture, 1850–1920, vol. 1, 1984, pp. 171–257.
- Speck, Josef: "Ein latènezeitlicher Hortfund von Altdorf UR", in: Der Geschichtsfreund. Mitteilungen des Historischen Vereins der fünf Orte Luzern, Uri, Schwyz, Unterwalden ob und nid dem Wald und Zug, 139, 1986, pp. 5–22.
- Historischer Verein der Fünf Orte (ed.): Innerschweiz und frühe Eidgenossenschaft. Jubiläumsschrift 700 Jahre Eidgenossenschaft, 2 vol., 1990.
- Zurfluh, Kurt: Steinige Pfade. 160 Jahre Urner Wirtschaftsgeschichte [1830–1990], 1990.
- Kälin, Urs: Die Urner Magistratenfamilien. Herrschaft, ökonomische Lage und Lebensstil einer ländlichen Oberschicht 1700–1850, 1991.
- Stadler, Hans: Geschichte des Landes Uri. Teil 1: Von den Anfängen bis zur frühen Neuzeit, 1993 (2015³).
- Gasser, Helmi: Altdorf 1. Teil. Geschichte, Siedlungsentwicklung, Sakralbauten, 2001 (Die Kunstdenkmäler des Kantons Uri, 1.1).
- Gasser, Helmi: Altdorf 2. Teil. Öffentliche und private Bauten, 2004 (Die Kunstdenkmäler des Kantons Uri, 1.2).
