= Spiringen =

- Municipality
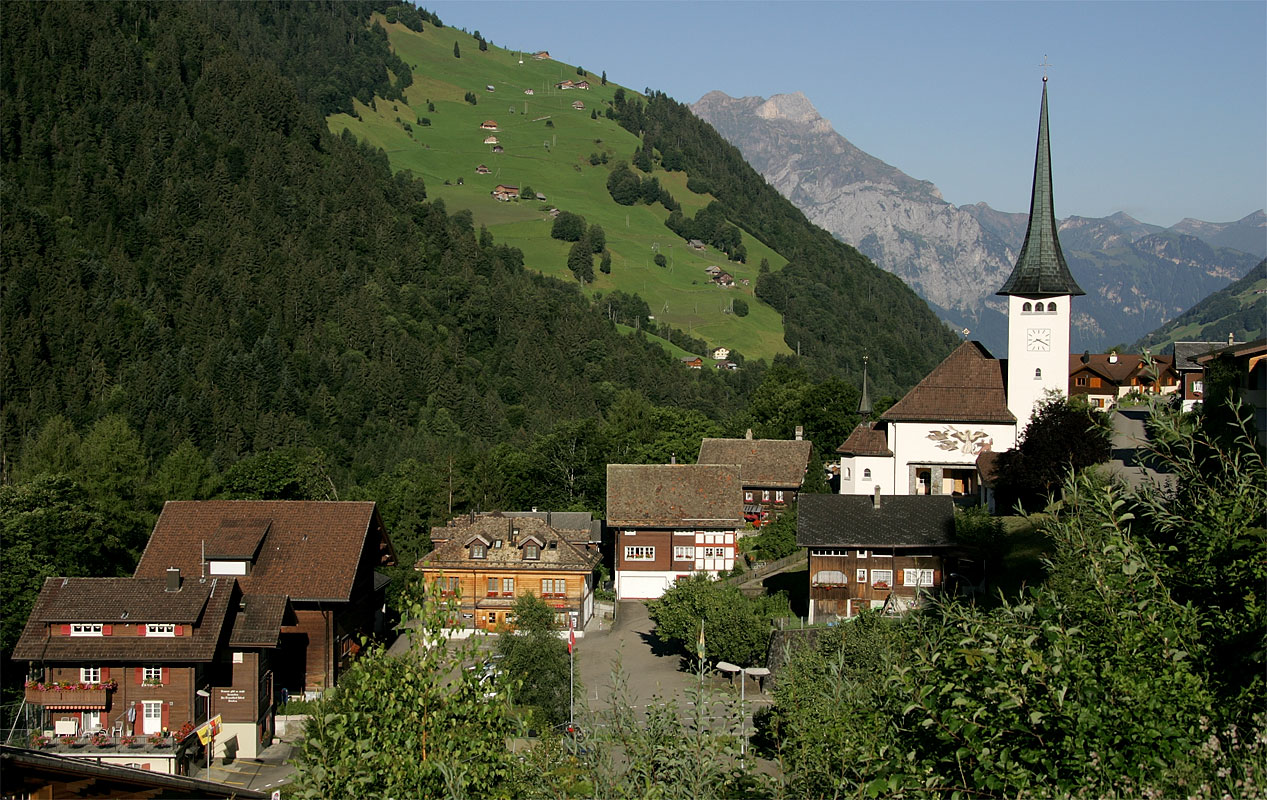

- Flag Coat of arms
- Location of Spiringen
- Location within Switzerland Location within Canton of Uri
- Coordinates: 46°52′N 8°44′E
- Country: Switzerland
- Canton: Uri
- District: n.a.

Area
  - Total: 64.76 km^{2} (25.00 sq mi)
- Elevation: 923 m (3,028 ft)

Population (December 2020)
  - Total: 842
  - Density: 13.0/km^{2} (33.7/sq mi)
- Time zone: UTC+01:00 (CET)
  - Summer (DST): UTC+02:00 (CEST)
- Postal code: 6464
- SFOS number: 1218
- ISO 3166 code: CH-UR
- Surrounded by: Bürglen, Glarus Süd (GL), Muotathal (SZ), Schattdorf, Unterschächen
- Website: www.spiringen.ch

Spiringen is a village and a municipality in the canton of Uri in Switzerland. The municipality comprises two disjoint areas, separated by the municipality of Unterschächen and the Klausen Pass. The western area includes the village of Spiringen in the Schächen Valley, whilst the eastern area includes the Urner Boden alp above Linthal and the canton of Glarus.

== Geography ==
Spiringen has an area, as of 2006, of 64.7 km^{2} (25.0 sq mi). This area is split into two parts, with the slightly smaller part around the village of Spiringen in the valley of the Schächen, which drains westward towards the Reuss and Lake Lucerne. This part is surrounded by the municipalities of Bürglen and Schattdorf to the north and west, and the municipality of Unterschächen to the east and south. Some 8 kilometres (5.0 mi) away, on the eastern side of Unterschächen and the Klausen Pass, is the second and larger part of the municipality. This comprises the Urner Boden meadows, and drains eastward into the Linth and Lake Zürich. Besides Unterschächen to its west, this part is surrounded on its north by the municipality of Muotathal in the canton of Schwyz, and on its south and east by the municipality of Glarus Süd in the canton of Glarus.

Of the total area of the municipality, 37.5% is used for agricultural purposes, while 17.6% is forested. Of the rest of the land, 1.4% is settled (buildings or roads) and the remainder (43.5%) is non-productive (rivers, glaciers or mountains). In the 1997 land survey, 11.7% of the total land area was heavily forested, while 3.2% is covered in small trees and shrubbery. Of the agricultural land, 0.0% is used for farming or pastures, while 8.5% is used for orchards or vine crops and 29.0% is used for alpine pastures. Of the settled areas, 0.5% is covered with buildings, and 0.7% is transportation infrastructure. Of the unproductive areas, 0.1% is unproductive standing water (ponds or lakes), 0.9% is unproductive flowing water (rivers), 32.6% is too rocky for vegetation, and 10.0% is other unproductive land.

== Demographics ==
Spiringen has a population (as of 31 December 2020) of 842. As of 2007, 0.9% of the population was made up of foreign nationals. Over the last 10 years the population has decreased at a rate of -11.6%. Most of the population (as of 2000) speaks German (99.8%), with Italian being second most common ( 0.2%) and Sd being third (gdsD%). As of 2007 the gender distribution of the population was 51.8% male and 48.2% female.

In the 2007 federal election the FDP party received 91.3% of the vote.

In Spiringen about 37% of the population (between age 25–64) have completed either non-mandatory upper secondary education or additional higher education (either university or a Fachhochschule).

Spiringen has an unemployment rate of 0.34%. As of 2005, there were 194 people employed in the primary economic sector and about 88 businesses involved in this sector. 38 people are employed in the secondary sector and there are 8 businesses in this sector. 78 people are employed in the tertiary sector, with 19 businesses in this sector.

The historical population is given in the following table:

year	population
1970	946
1980	943
1990	921
2000	963
2005	943
2007	909
