= Bürglen, Uri =

Bürglen
- Municipality
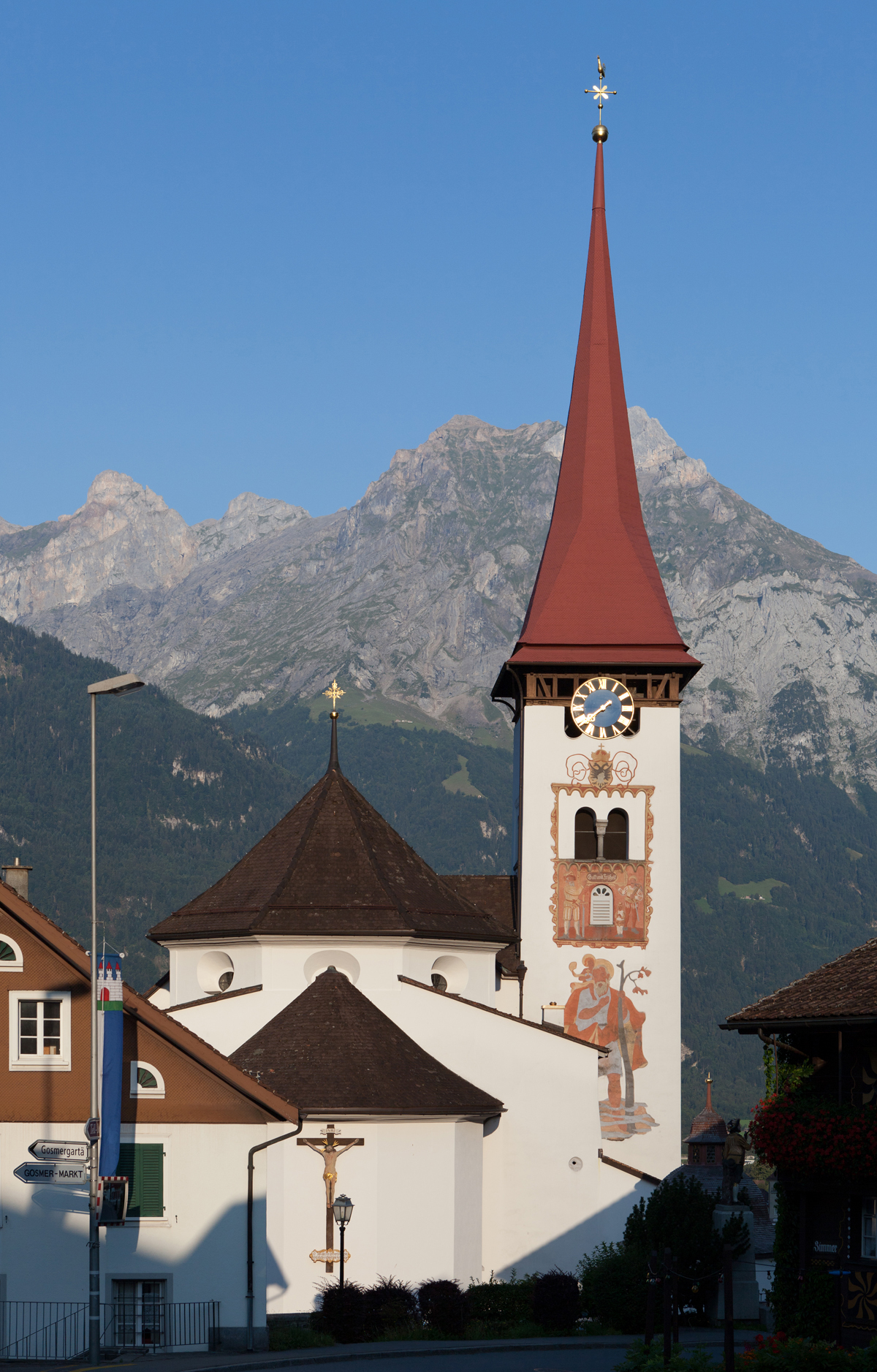

- Coat of arms
- Location of Bürglen
- Location within Switzerland Location within Canton of Uri
- Coordinates: 46°52′N 8°39′E
- Country: Switzerland
- Canton: Uri
- District: n.a.

Government
  - Mayor: Urban Camenzind-Arnold

Area
  - Total: 53.14 km^{2} (20.52 sq mi)
- Elevation: 525 m (1,722 ft)

Population (December 2020)
  - Total: 3,930
  - Density: 74.0/km^{2} (192/sq mi)
- Time zone: UTC+01:00 (CET)
  - Summer (DST): UTC+02:00 (CEST)
- Postal code: 6463
- SFOS number: 1205
- ISO 3166 code: CH-UR
- Surrounded by: Altdorf, Attinghausen, Flüelen, Muotathal (SZ), Riemenstalden (SZ), Schattdorf, Sisikon, Spiringen, Unterschächen
- Website: www.buerglen.ch

Bürglen is a municipality in the canton of Uri in Switzerland.

== History ==
Bürglen is first mentioned in 857 as Burgilla. In 1240 it was mentioned as Burgelon.

== Geography ==
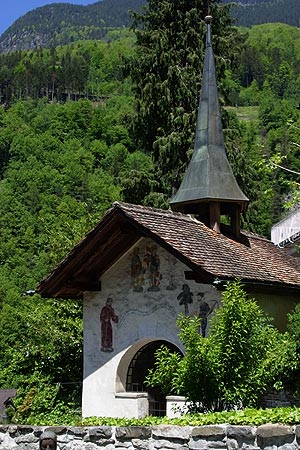
William Tell chapel in Bürglen

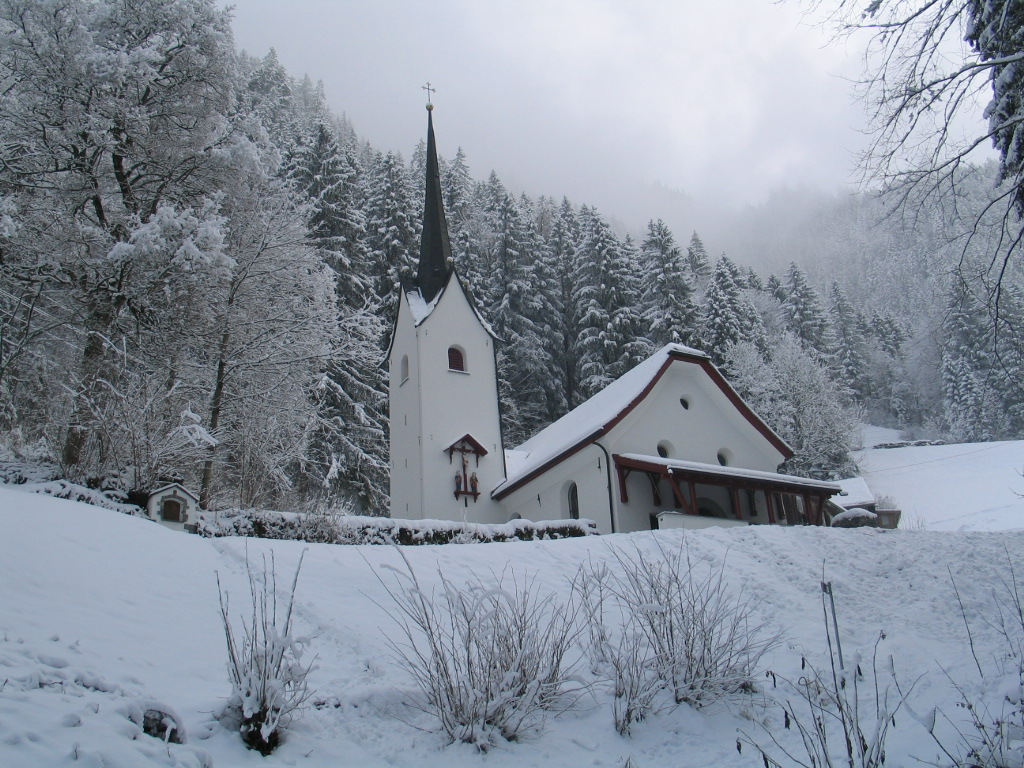
Chapel in the Rieder valley, which is part of Bürglen

Aerial view (1963)

Bürglen has an area, as of 2006, of 53.1 km^{2} (20.5 sq mi). Of this area, 51.4% is used for agricultural purposes, while 19.9% is forested. Of the rest of the land, 2.1% is settled (buildings or roads) and the remainder (26.6%) is non-productive (rivers, glaciers or mountains). In the 1997 land survey, 15.0% of the total land area was heavily forested, while 1.2% is covered in small trees and shrubbery. Of the agricultural land, 0.2% is used for farming or pastures, while 13.2% is used for orchards or vine crops and 38.1% is used for alpine pastures. Of the settled areas, 1.0% is covered with buildings, 0.2% is industrial, and 0.9% is transportation infrastructure. Of the unproductive areas, 0.1% is unproductive standing water (ponds or lakes), 0.8% is unproductive flowing water (rivers), 12.5% is too rocky for vegetation, and 13.2% is other unproductive land.

The municipality is located south east of Altdorf at the entrance of the Schächental valley. The village is at the start of the road over the pass Klausenpass, which connects Uri and Glarus. It consists of the village center of Bürglen which is located above the left bank of the Schächen river, and scattered settlements which stretch from the valley floor up the mountains to an elevation of about 1,700 m (5,600 ft).

== Demographics ==
Bürglen has a population (as of 31 December 2020) of 3,930. As of 2007, 3.6% of the population was made up of foreign nationals. Over the last 10 years the population has grown at a rate of 4%. Most of the population (as of 2000) speaks German (96.7%), with Serbo-Croatian being second most common ( 1.0%) and Albanian being third ( 0.5%). As of 2007 the gender distribution of the population was 51.9% male and 48.1% female.

The entire Swiss population is generally well educated. In Bürglen about 61.2% of the population (between age 25–64) have completed either non-mandatory upper secondary education or additional higher education (either university or a Fachhochschule).

Bürglen has an unemployment rate of 0.49%. As of 2005, there were 284 people employed in the primary economic sector and about 126 businesses involved in this sector. 727 people are employed in the secondary sector and there are 35 businesses in this sector. 733 people are employed in the tertiary sector, with 79 businesses in this sector.

The historical population is given in the following table:

year	population
1743	910
1799	1,150
1850	1,294
1900	1,656
1950	2,723
2000	3,878

== Notable residents ==
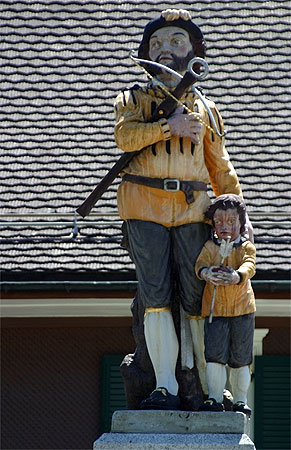
William Tell monument in Bürglen

- According to legend, this village is the home of William Tell.
- Priest Wendelin Bucheli of Bürglen became well known within Switzerland in February 2015 for blessing a lesbian couple, in the aftermath of which the bishop of Chur questioned his status as a priest. Residents and people throughout the country supported his action.
