= Landrat of Uri =

Type
- Type: Unicameral

Leadership
- President: Cathry Ruedi, FDP since 18 June 2025
- Vice President: Arnold Pascal, SVP since 18 June 2025

Structure
- Seats: 64
- Political groups: SP/Greens (7) GLP (3) The Centre (23) FDP (12) SVP (17) Independent (2)

Elections
- Last election: 18 June 2024
- Next election: 2028

The Landrat of Uri is the legislature of the canton of Uri, in Switzerland. Uri has a unicameral legislature. The Cantonal Council has 64 seats, with members elected every four years. After the 2012 election, one of the seats remained vacant with a second election on April 15, 2012 to fill it.

== Elections ==
=== 2012 election ===
Distribution of seats after the 2012 election

Summary of the 11 March 2012 Uri Landrat election results
Party	Ideology	Seats	Seats ±
Christian Democratic People's Party	Christian democracy	23	-1
FDP.The Liberals	Classical liberalism	14	+2
Social Democratic Party/Green Party	Social democracy/Green politics	11	+1
Swiss People's Party	National conservatism	14	-4
Unaffiliated	N/A	1	+1
Total		63	–
Source: Canton of Uri

=== 2016 election ===
Distribution of seats after the 2016 election

Summary of the 28 February 2016 Uri Landrat election results
Party	Ideology	Seats	Seats ±
Christian Democratic People's Party	Christian democracy	22	-1
FDP.The Liberals	Classical liberalism	18	+2
Social Democratic Party/Green Party	Social democracy/Green politics	9	-2
Swiss People's Party	National conservatism	15	1
Total		64	–

=== 2020 election ===
Summary of the 8 March 2020 Uri Landrat election results
Party	Ideology	Seats	Seats ±
Christian Democratic People's Party	Christian democracy	25	▲3
FDP.The Liberals	Classical liberalism	16	▼2
Swiss People's Party	National conservatism	14	▼1
Social Democratic Party/Green Party	Social democracy/Green politics	9	0
Total		64	–
