= Attinghausen =

- Municipality
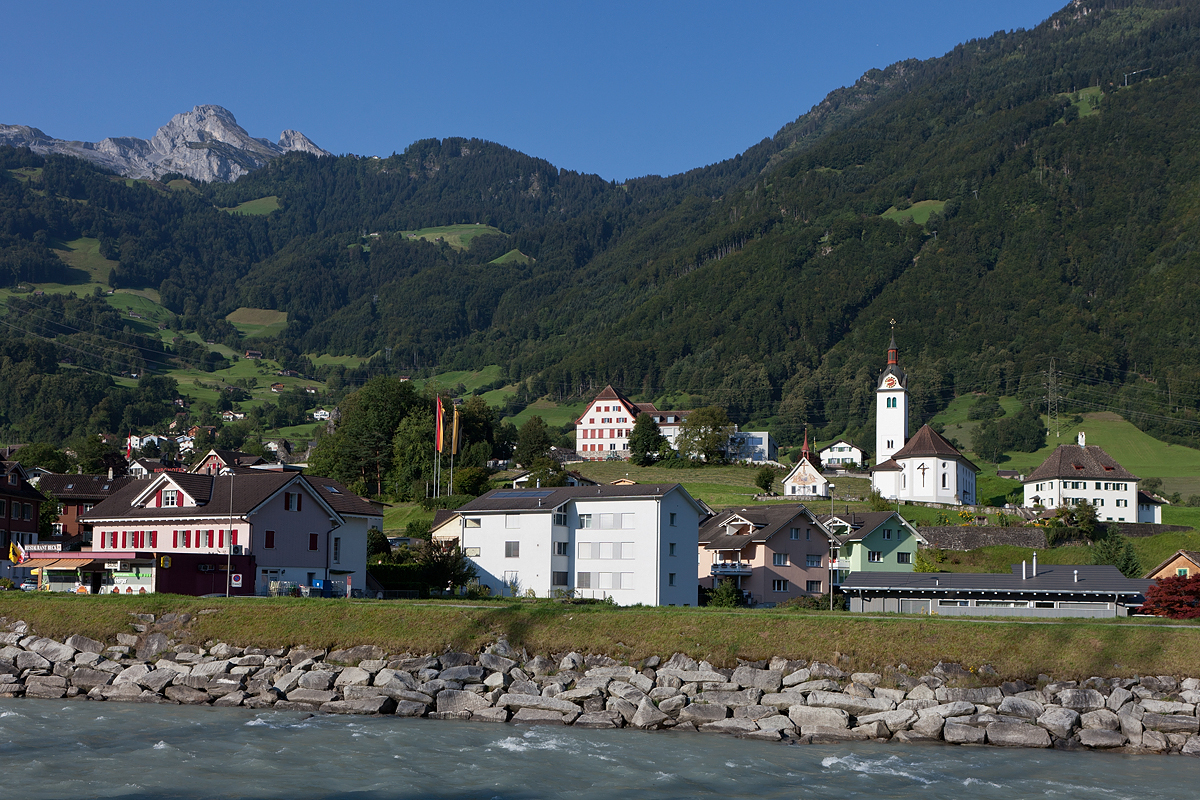
- Attinghausen village

- Coat of arms
- Location of Attinghausen
- Location within Switzerland Location within Canton of Uri
- Coordinates: 46°51′N 8°37′E
- Country: Switzerland
- Canton: Uri
- District: n.a.

Area
  - Total: 46.83 km^{2} (18.08 sq mi)
- Elevation: 469 m (1,539 ft)

Population (December 2020)
  - Total: 1,747
  - Density: 37.31/km^{2} (96.62/sq mi)
- Time zone: UTC+01:00 (CET)
  - Summer (DST): UTC+02:00 (CEST)
- Postal code: 6468
- SFOS number: 1203
- ISO 3166 code: CH-UR
- Surrounded by: Altdorf, Bürglen, Engelberg (OW), Erstfeld, Isenthal, Schattdorf, Seedorf, Wassen
- Website: www.attinghausen.ch

Attinghausen is a village and a municipality in the canton of Uri in Switzerland.

== History ==
Attinghausen is first mentioned in 1240 as Attingenhusen by the HDS.

== Geography ==
Attinghausen has an area, as of 2006, of 46.8 km^{2} (18.1 sq mi). Of this area, 35.3% is used for agricultural purposes, while 17.5% is forested. Of the rest of the land, 1.7% is settled (buildings or roads) and the remainder (45.5%) is non-productive (rivers, glaciers or mountains). In the 1993/97 land survey, 13.6% of the total land area was heavily forested, while 2.9% is covered in small trees and shrubbery. Of the agricultural land, 0.2% is used for farming or pastures, while 4.8% is used for orchards or vine crops and 30.3% is used for alpine pastures. Of the settled areas, 0.9% is covered with buildings, 0.4% is classed as special developments, and 0.3% is transportation infrastructure. Of the unproductive areas, 0.1% is unproductive standing water (ponds or lakes), 0.9% is unproductive flowing water (rivers), 36.1% is too rocky for vegetation, and 8.4% is other unproductive land.

The municipality is located around a bridge over the Reuss.

== Demographics ==
Attinghausen has a population (as of 31 December 2020) of 1,747. As of 2007, 4.2% of the population was made up of foreign nationals. Over the last 10 years the population has grown at a rate of 4.8%. Most of the population (as of 2000) speaks German (96.6%), with Serbo-Croatian being second most common ( 0.7%) and Dutch being third ( 0.5%). As of 2007 the gender distribution of the population was 50.9% male and 49.1% female.

In Attinghausen about 71.9% of the population (between age 25–64) have completed either non-mandatory upper secondary education or additional higher education (either university or a Fachhochschule).

Attinghausen has an unemployment rate of 0.53%. As of 2005, there were 102 people employed in the primary economic sector and about 44 businesses involved in this sector. 80 people are employed in the secondary sector and there are 10 businesses in this sector. 153 people are employed in the tertiary sector, with 19 businesses in this sector.

The historical population is given in the following table:

year	population
1743	354
1799	484
1850	516
1900	528
1950	993
2000	1487
