= Schattdorf =

- Municipality
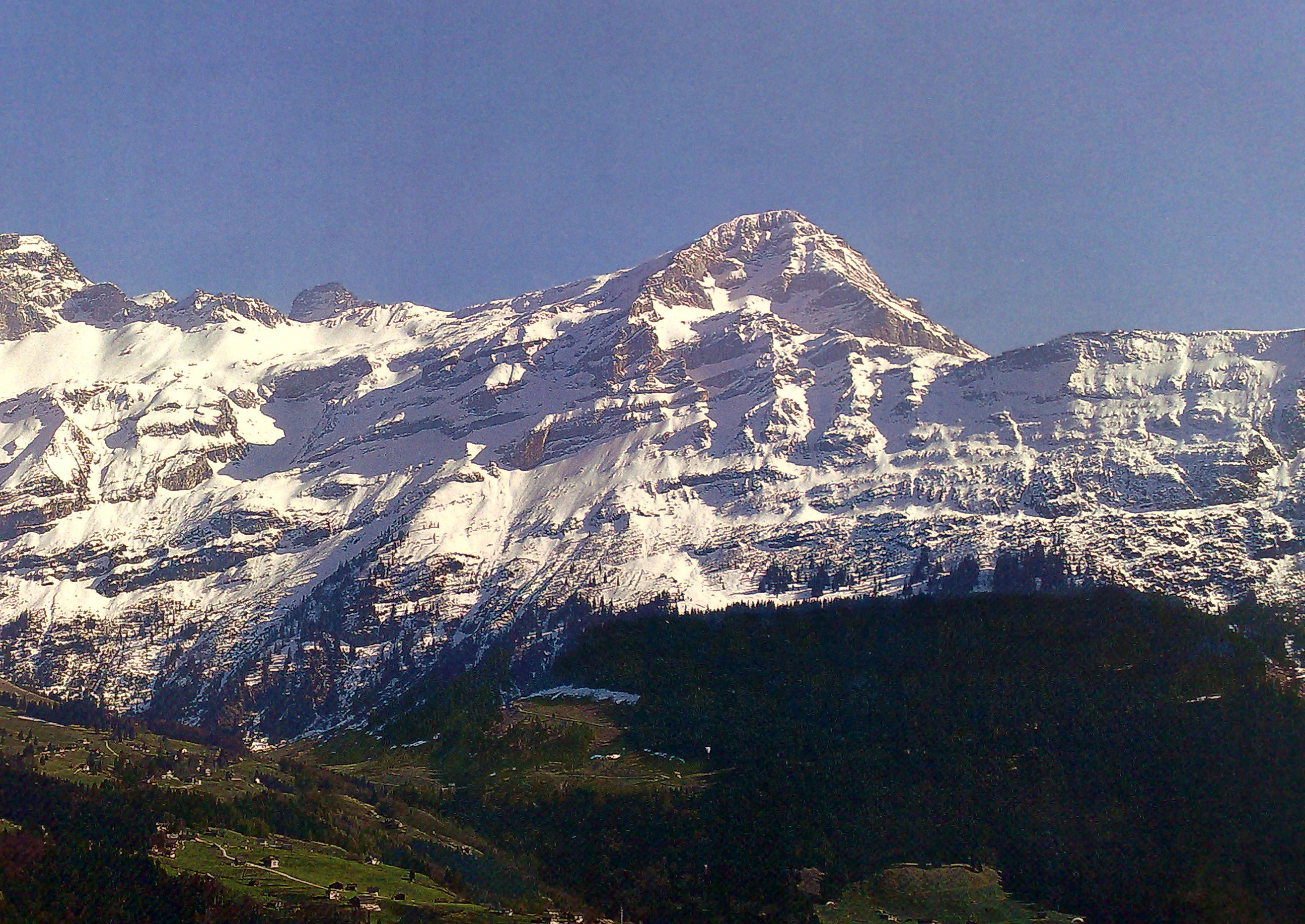

- Flag Coat of arms
- Location of Schattdorf
- Location within Switzerland Location within Canton of Uri
- Coordinates: 46°51′N 8°39′E
- Country: Switzerland
- Canton: Uri
- District: n.a.

Area
  - Total: 16.27 km^{2} (6.28 sq mi)
- Elevation: 481 m (1,578 ft)

Population (December 2020)
  - Total: 5,408
  - Density: 332.4/km^{2} (860.9/sq mi)
- Time zone: UTC+01:00 (CET)
  - Summer (DST): UTC+02:00 (CEST)
- Postal code: 6467
- SFOS number: 1213
- ISO 3166 code: CH-UR
- Surrounded by: Attinghausen, Bürglen, Erstfeld, Silenen, Spiringen, Unterschächen
- Website: www.schattdorf.ch

Schattdorf is a village and a municipality in the canton of Uri in Switzerland.

== History ==
Schattdorf is first mentioned in 1248 as Sachdorf.

== Geography ==
Aerial view from 400 m by Walter Mittelholzer (1931)

Schattdorf has an area, as of 2006, of 16.3 km^{2} (6.3 sq mi). Of this area, 33.6% is used for agricultural purposes, while 37.7% is forested. Of the rest of the land, 11% is settled (buildings or roads) and the remainder (17.8%) is non-productive (rivers, glaciers or mountains). In the 1997 land survey, 29.1% of the total land area was heavily forested, while 4.5% is covered in small trees and shrubbery. Of the agricultural land, 0.4% is used for farming or pastures, while 23.4% is used for orchards or vine crops and 9.8% is used for alpine pastures. Of the settled areas, 4.3% is covered with buildings, 3.5% is industrial, 0.2% is classed as special developments, 0.5% is listed as parks and greenbelts and 2.5% is transportation infrastructure. Of the unproductive areas, 0.9% is unproductive flowing water (rivers), 8.2% is too rocky for vegetation, and 8.7% is other unproductive land.

The municipality is located along the Reuss between the Schächenbach and the Reuss. The village is located on the valley floor but stretches up the mountain side to the hamlet of Haldi which is 1,079 m (3,540 ft) above sea level.

== Demographics ==
Schattdorf has a population (as of 31 December 2020) of 5,408. As of 2007, 6.5% of the population was made up of foreign nationals. Over the last 10 years the population has decreased at a rate of -4.7%. Most of the population (as of 2000) speaks German (94.7%), with Serbo-Croatian being second most common ( 1.5%) and Italian being third ( 0.9%). As of 2007 the gender distribution of the population was 51.0% male and 49.0% female.

In the 2007 federal election the FDP party received 87.6% of the vote.

In Schattdorf about 64.7% of the population (between age 25-64) have completed either non-mandatory upper secondary education or additional higher education (either university or a Fachhochschule).

Schattdorf has an unemployment rate of 0.74%. As of 2005, there were 125 people employed in the primary economic sector and about 50 businesses involved in this sector. 1,003 people are employed in the secondary sector and there are 44 businesses in this sector. 1,075 people are employed in the tertiary sector, with 92 businesses in this sector.

The historical population is given in the following table:

| year | population |
|---|---|
| 1743 | 602 |
| 1799 | 650 |
| 1811 | 628 |
| 1850 | 822 |
| 1900 | 1,128 |
| 1950 | 2,217 |
| 1970 | 3,292 |
| 1980 | 4,516 |
| 1990 | 4,802 |
| 2000 | 4,897 |
| 2005 | 4,829 |
| 2007 | 4,814 |

== Notable people ==
- John Z'graggen, missionary priest and linguist
