= Unterschächen =

- Municipality
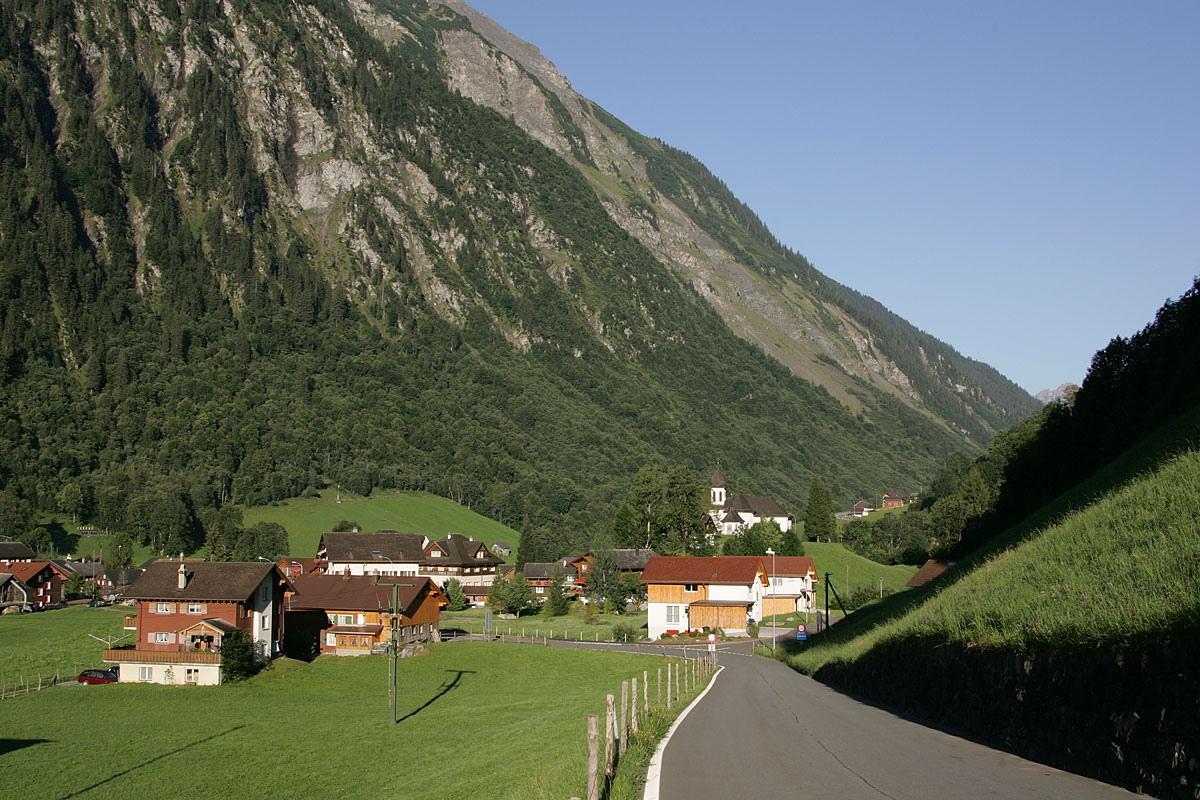

- Flag Coat of arms
- Location of Unterschächen
- Location within Switzerland Location within Canton of Uri
- Coordinates: 46°51′N 8°46′E
- Country: Switzerland
- Canton: Uri
- District: n.a.

Area
  - Total: 80.22 km^{2} (30.97 sq mi)
- Elevation: 995 m (3,264 ft)

Population (December 2020)
  - Total: 695
  - Density: 8.66/km^{2} (22.4/sq mi)
- Time zone: UTC+01:00 (CET)
  - Summer (DST): UTC+02:00 (CEST)
- Postal code: 6465
- SFOS number: 1219
- ISO 3166 code: CH-UR
- Surrounded by: Bürglen, Muotathal (SZ), Schattdorf, Silenen, Spiringen
- Website: www.unterschaechen.ch

Unterschächen is a municipality in the canton of Uri in Switzerland, situated in the upper Schächental.

== Geography ==
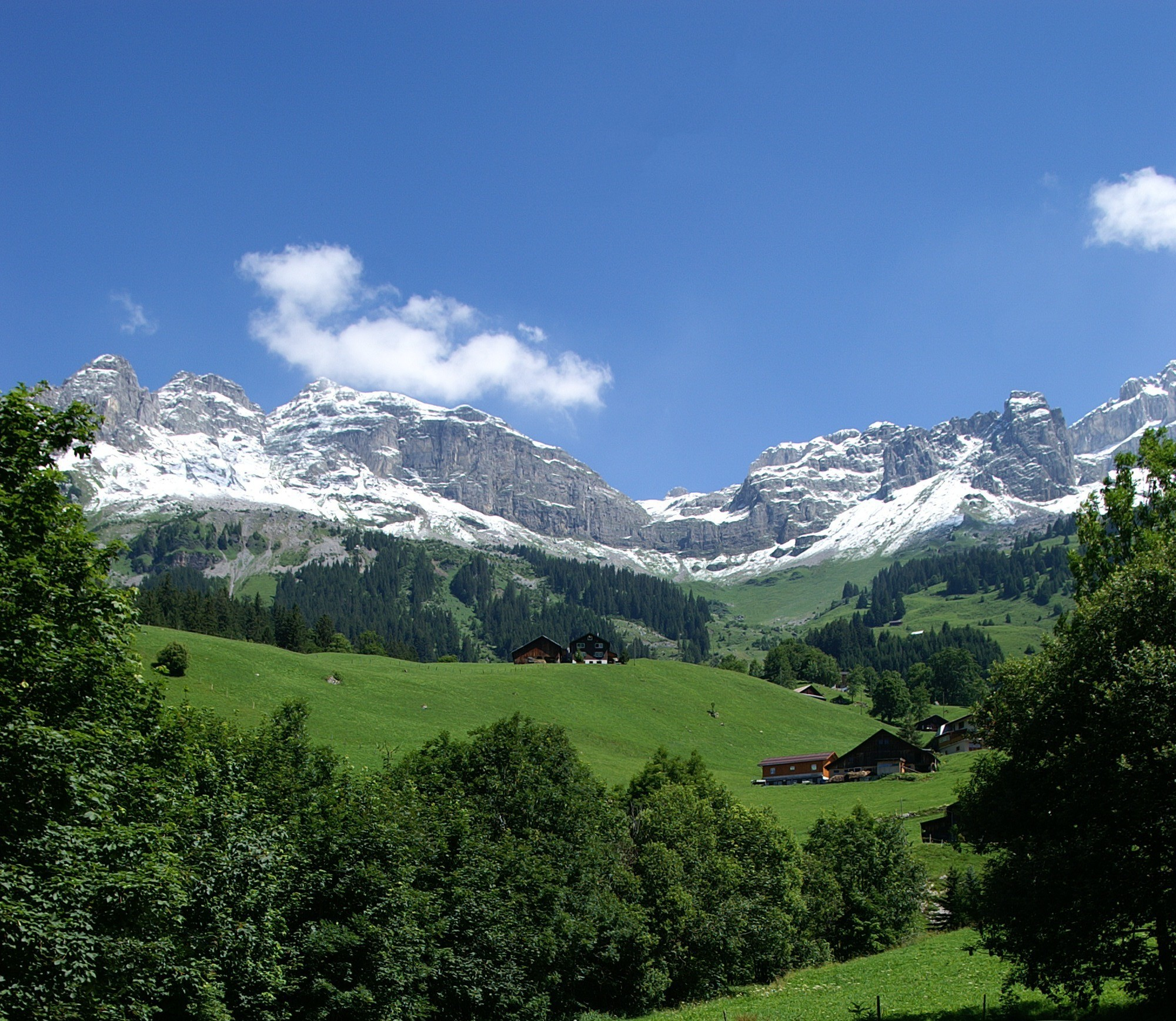
Klausen Pass from the hamlet of Urigen in Unterschächen

Unterschächen has an area, as of 2006, of 80.3 km^{2} (31.0 sq mi). Of this area, 35.6% is used for agricultural purposes, while 9.4% is forested. Of the rest of the land, 0.8% is settled (buildings or roads) and the remainder (54.2%) is non-productive (rivers, glaciers or mountains). In the 1997 land survey, 5.6% of the total land area was heavily forested, while 2.1% is covered in small trees and shrubbery. Of the agricultural land, 4.3% is used for orchards or vine crops and 31.3% is used for alpine pastures. Of the settled areas, 0.3% is covered with buildings, and 0.5% is transportation infrastructure. Of the unproductive areas, 0.5% is unproductive flowing water (rivers), 40.4% is too rocky for vegetation, and 13.2% is other unproductive land.

== Demographics ==
Unterschächen has a population (as of 31 December 2020) of 695. As of 2007, 1.0% of the population was made up of foreign nationals. Over the last 10 years the population has decreased at a rate of -6.6%. Most of the population (as of 2000) speaks German (99.6%), with Italian being second most common ( 0.3%) and Portuguese being third ( 0.1%). As of 2007 the gender distribution of the population was 52.2% male and 47.8% female.

In the 2007 federal election the FDP party received 95.1% of the vote.

In Unterschächen about 37% of the population (between age 25–64) have completed either non-mandatory upper secondary education or additional higher education (either university or a Fachhochschule).

Unterschächen has an unemployment rate of 0.22%. As of 2005, there were 138 people employed in the primary economic sector and about 51 businesses involved in this sector. 7 people are employed in the secondary sector and there are 4 businesses in this sector. 66 people are employed in the tertiary sector, with 15 businesses in this sector.

The historical population is given in the following table:

year	population
1970	665
1980	652
1990	689
2000	764
2005	746
2007	730

== Weather ==
Unterschächen has an average of 155.5 days of rain per year and on average receives 1,773 mm (69.8 in) of precipitation. The wettest month is August during which time Unterschächen receives an average of 196 mm (7.7 in) of precipitation. During this month there is precipitation for an average of 14.8 days. The month with the most days of precipitation is July, with an average of 16, but with only 193 mm (7.6 in) of precipitation. The driest month of the year is October with an average of 107 mm (4.2 in) of precipitation over 14.8 days.
