= Postbrücke =

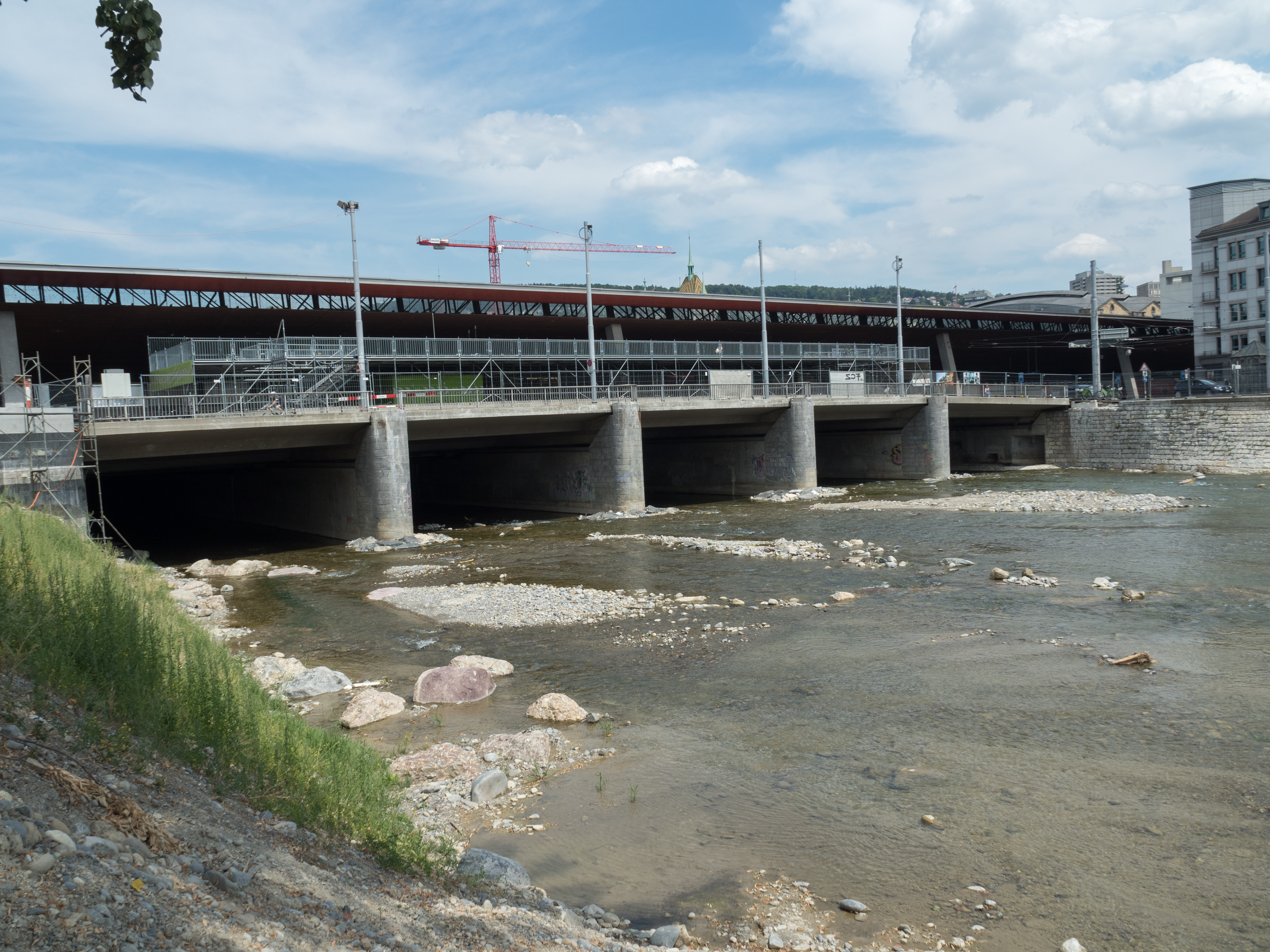
- Pictured in 2018, looking northeast
- Coordinates: 47.3779°N 8.5370°E
- Crosses: Sihl river
- Locale: Zurich, Switzerland
- Maintained by: City of Zurich

Characteristics
- Total length: 67 metres (220 ft)
- No. of spans: 5

History
- Opened: 1930 (95 years ago)

Postbrücke, lit. 'post bridge', is a bridge in Zurich, Switzerland, constructed between 1927 and 1930. Its name derives from the Sihlpost (lit. ' Sihl post'), located nearby and built in 1930. Located west of Bahnhofplatz, one of the city's main squares, and east of Europaallee, the bridge spans the Sihl river before it continues under the surface platforms of Zurich Main Station on its northern side. Zollbrücke spans the river on the station's northern side, while Gessnerbrücke crosses it south of Postbrücke.

Postbrücke, Gessnerallee parking deck and Sihlpost in 1971

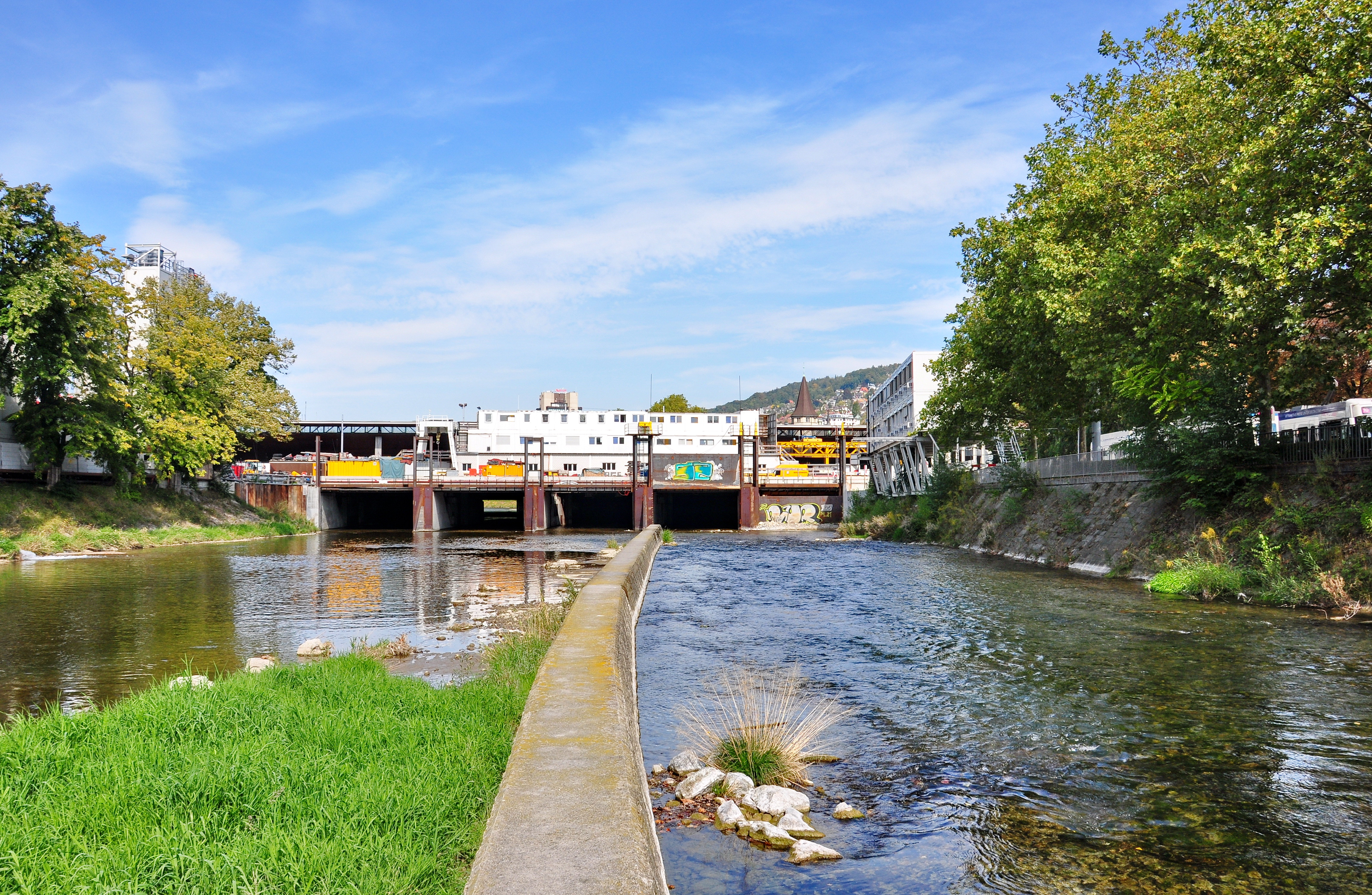
Deck over the Sihl in 2010

The bridge, which is about 67 metres (220 ft) long and has five spans, connects Bahnhofplatz and Gessnerallee to Kasernenstrasse. It is made of slab, with clad concrete pillars. Its superstructure was replaced in 1989 and it was reinforced in 2021. The surface of the brige contains a road (one way), a taxi stand and bicycle parkings.

In 2018, the section of the Sihl south of the bridge, up to the confluence with the Schanzengraben, was renaturalised to promote populations of fish, such as the common nase, and other aquatic organisms. This section was until 2004 covered by the Gessnerallee parking deck. Later, it was covered by a deck with facilities used for the construction of the Löwenstrasse underground station. During the construction, the bed of the Sihl below the platforms and adjacent bridges was lowered as a measure for flood prevention.

== See also ==
- Bahnhofbrücke
- Platzspitz park
- List of bridges in Switzerland
