= Tibit =

Tibit or tibits may refer to:

- Tibit - the unit symbol of tebibit
- Tibit/s, a data rate of tebibit per second
- Tibits (restaurant chain), vegetarian restaurant chain in Switzerland
