= Bahnhofplatz, Zurich =

City square in Zurich, Switzerland

Bahnhofplatz
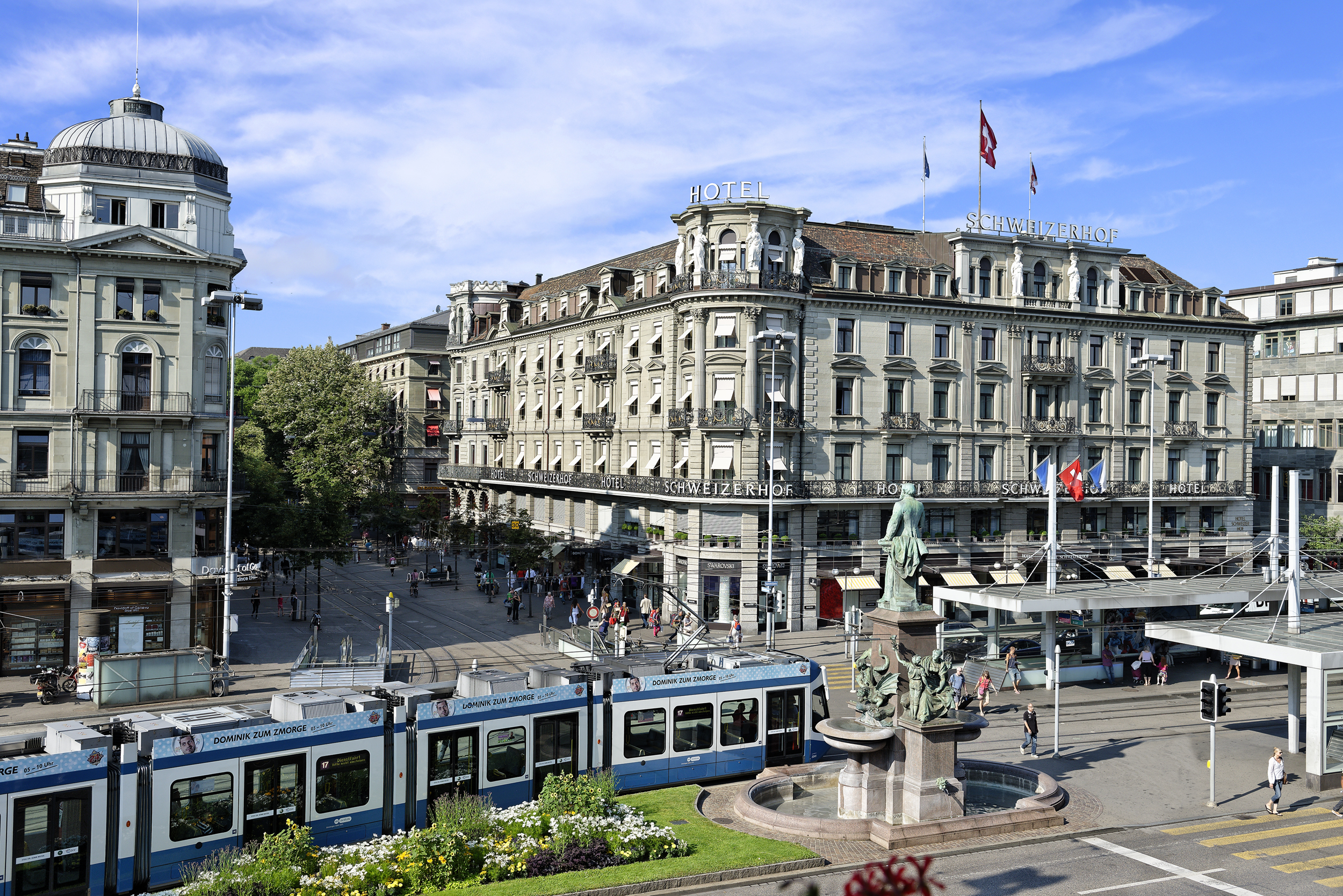
- Escher fountain and Bahnhofstrasse in 2013, looking southwest
- Interactive map of Bahnhofplatz
- Location: Zurich, Switzerland
- Postal code: 8001
- Coordinates: 47.377246°N 8.539777°E

Bahnhofplatz (German pronunciation: [ˈbaːnhoːfˌplats], lit. 'train station square') is a square in the city centre of Zurich, Switzerland. It is located in front of the southern entrance of the main building of Main Station (Hauptbahnhof or HB, completed in 1871) and at the northern end of Bahnhofstrasse, the city's shopping avenue.

The focal point of the square is a fountain surmounted by a statue of Alfred Escher, a Swiss railway pioneer among others, which was inaugurated in 1889. Its water forms an additional fountain in the underground level below the square. Besides Bahnhofstrasse, other roads leading to Bahnhofplatz are Löwenstrasse, Lintheschergasse and Waisenhausstrasse. Two bridges flank the square: Postbrücke to the west (across the river Sihl) and Bahnhofbrücke to the east (across the river Limmat).

The square features a central tram stop with two through tracks, Bahnhofplatz/HB, and is flanked by two trolleybus stops with the same name. The lines form part of the extensive Zurich public-transport system. The square is also flanked by a taxi stand and a few bicycle parkings. The square is connected with the underlying ShopVille mall via staircases, escalators and elevators. Also below the square is Zürich HB SZU station.

== Public transport ==
Bahnhofplatz/HB

General information
- Location: Bahnhofplatz; Zurich, Switzerland
- Coordinates: 47.37723°N 8.53943°E
- System: Verkehrsbetriebe Zürich tram and trolleybus stop
- Owner: Verkehrsbetriebe Zürich
- Operator: Verkehrsbetriebe Zürich
- Tram routes: 3
- Bus routes: 1

Services
Preceding station	Zürich tramway network	Following station
Löwenplatz towards Albisrieden	3	Central towards Klusplatz
Terminus	6 Continues as line 14	Central towards Zoo
Terminus	10 Deboarding only	Central towards Zürich Airport
Löwenplatz towards Triemli	14 Continues as line 6	Terminus
Location

Bahnhofplatz/HB is one of three tram/bus stops adjacent to Zürich Hauptbahnhof, the others being Bahnhofquai/HB and Sihlquai/HB. Four other tram/bus stops are within walking distance to the railway station: Bahnhofstrasse/HB, Central, Löwenplatz and Sihlpost/HB.

Three of the city's sixteen tram lines serve Bahnhofplatz/HB tram stop via the two tram tracks in the centre of the square. They are lines 3, 10 and 14. They are operated by VBZ, with line 10 being jointly operated with VBG. Line 3 runs between Albisrieden and Klusplatz; line 10 between Löwenplatz (only boarding) and Zurich Airport; and line 14 between Triemli and Seebach. Bahnhofplatz/HB is also served by trolleybus line 31, also operated by VBZ, the bus stops of which are located on the northern and southern sides of the square.

Lines with selected stops

Line 3: Albisrieden – Albisriederplatz – Stauffacher – Bahnhofplatz/HB – Central – Kunsthaus – Römerhof – Klusplatz

Line 10: (Löwenplatz (Note: only boarding as this stop lies on the turning loop of the line. Bahnhofplatz/HB is the terminus in the opposite direction) –) Bahnhofplatz/HB – Central – ETH/Universitätsspital – Seilbahn Rigiblick – Milchbuck – Sternen Oerlikon – Bhf. Oerlikon Ost – Glattpark – Bhf. Glattbrugg – Zurich Airport (Zurich)

Line 14: Triemli – Stauffacher – Bahnhofplatz/HB – Schaffhauserplatz – Milchbuck – Sternen Oerlikon – Bhf. Oerlikon Ost – Seebach

Line 31: Hermetschloo – Bhf. Altstetten – Hardplatz – Bahnhofplatz/HB – Central – Kunsthaus – Hegibachplatz – Klusplatz – Kienastenwies

Due to the renovation of the nearby Bahnhofquai/HB tram stop from December 2025 until December 2026, some tram routes are temporarily redirected which affects Bahnhofplatz. During this period, the line 10 departs from Bahnhofstrasse instead and only allows deboarding at Bahnhofplatz. The line 14 coming from Triemli terminates at Bahnhofplatz and continues as the line 6 towards Zoo.

Temporary modified lines with selected stops December 2025 – December 2026

Line 10: Bahnhofstrasse – (Bahnhofplatz/HB (Note: only deboarding when terminating here coming from the direction Zurich Airport) –) Central – ETH/Universitätsspital – Seilbahn Rigiblick – Milchbuck – Sternen Oerlikon – Bhf. Oerlikon Ost – Glattpark – Bhf. Glattbrugg – Zurich Airport (Zurich)

Line 14: Triemli – Stauffacher – Bahnhofplatz/HB continues as Line 6:Bahnhofplatz/HB – Central – ETH/Universitätsspital – Kirche Fluntern – Zoo

== Gallery ==
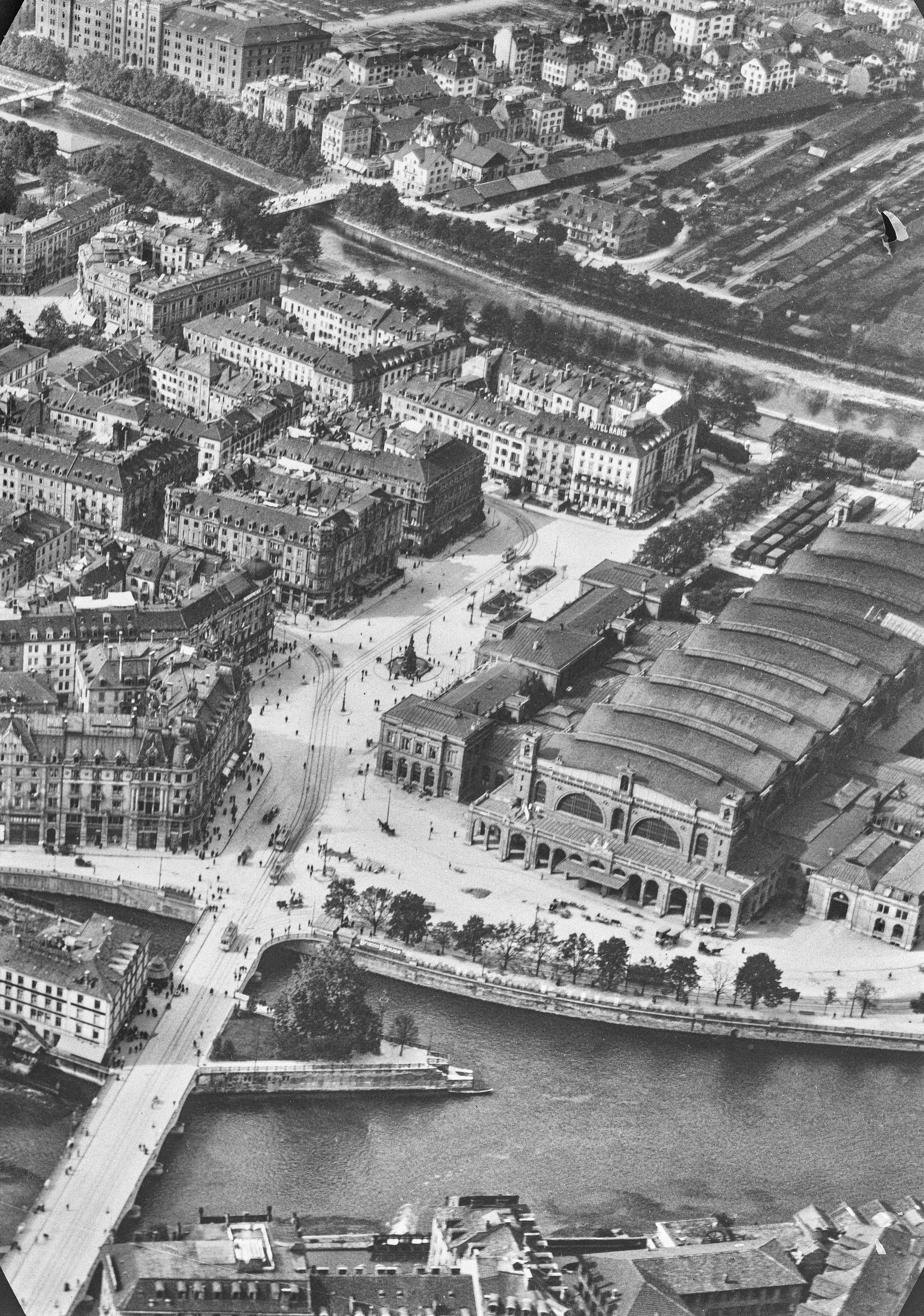
Aerial photograph, by Eduard Spelterini in the 19th century, showing Bahnhofplatz in the centre

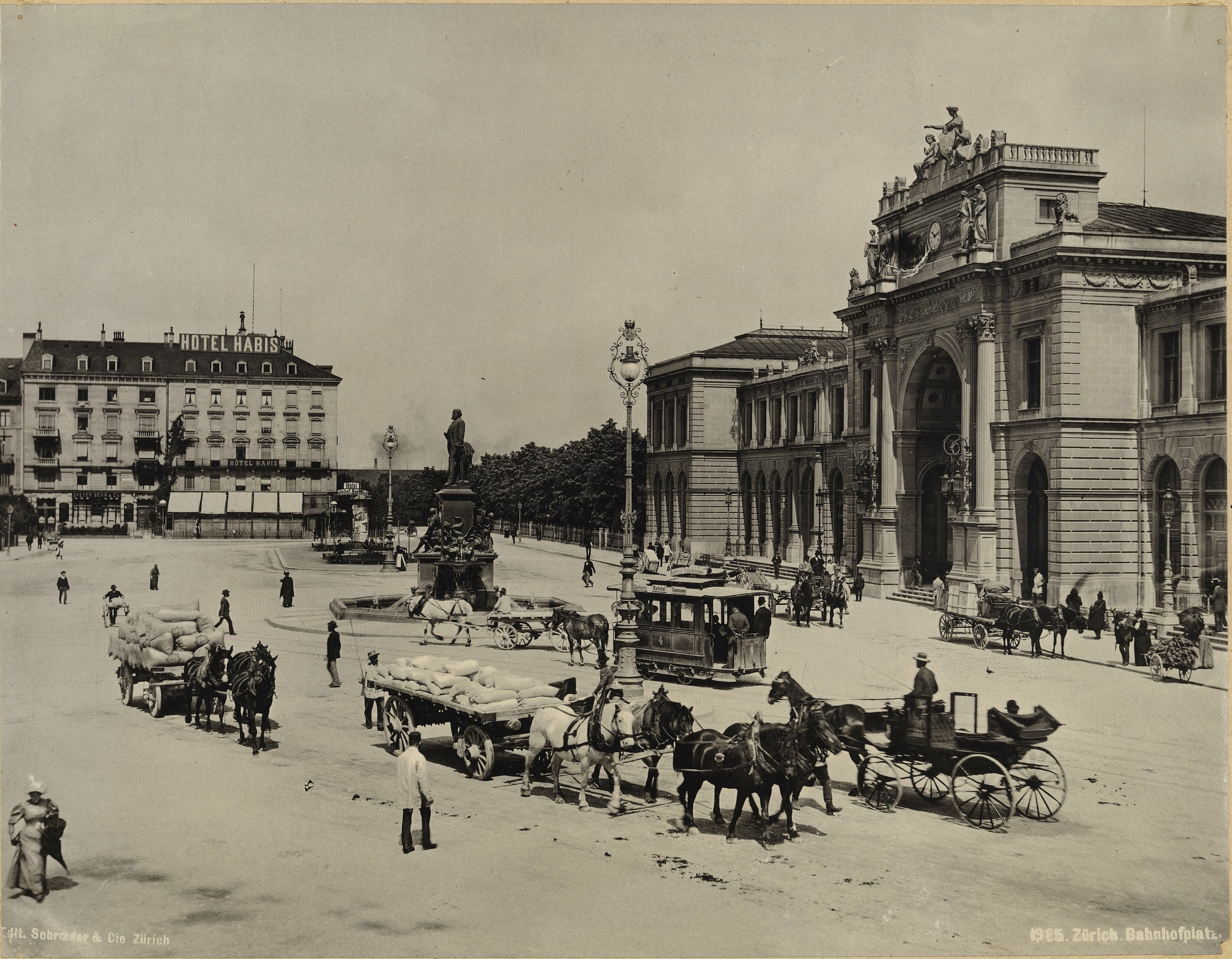
The square pictured in 1902, looking west

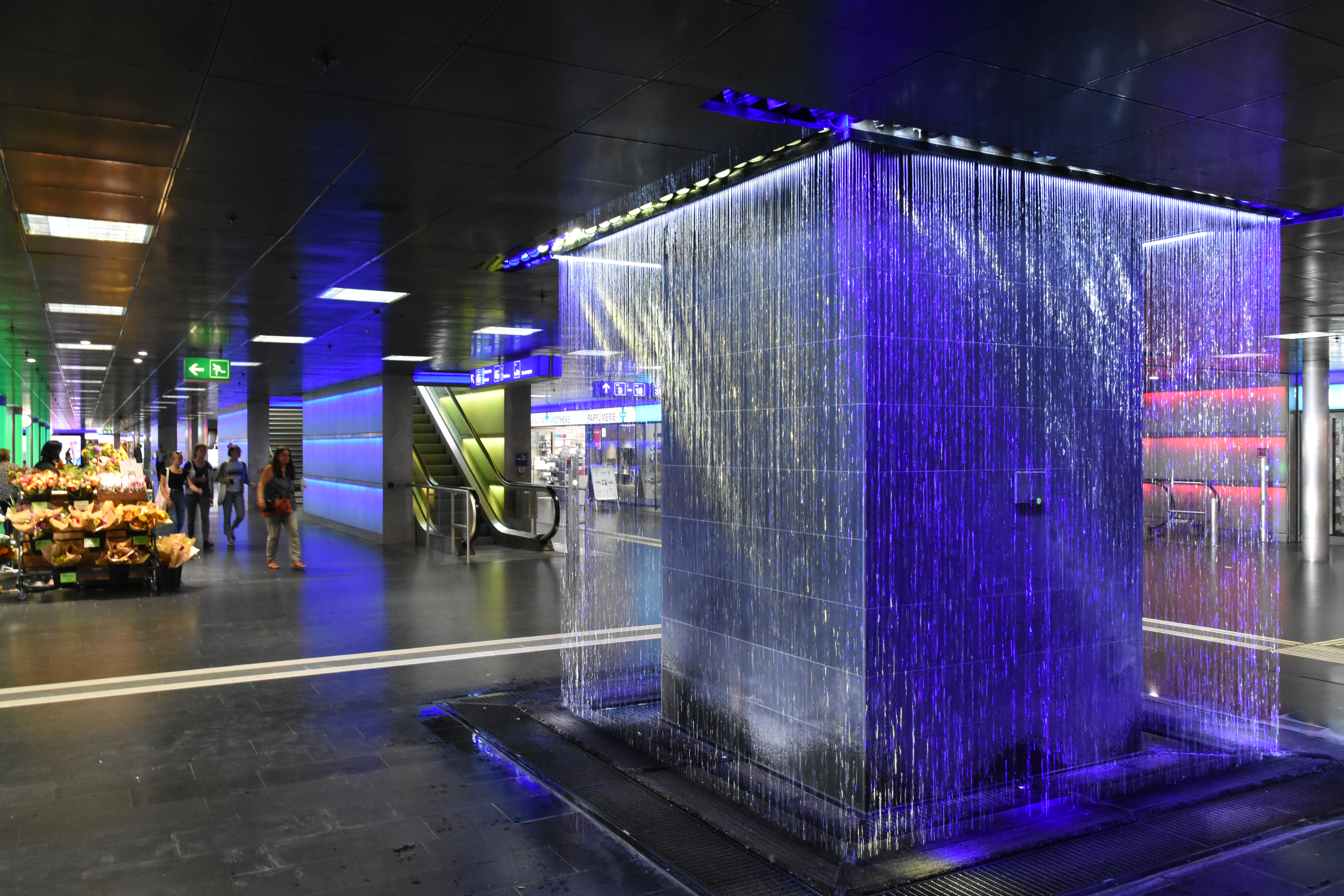
Fountain in ShopVille below Bahnhofplatz

== See also ==
- Europaallee
- Platzspitz park
