= Hiltl Restaurant =

Swiss vegetarian restaurant

Hiltl
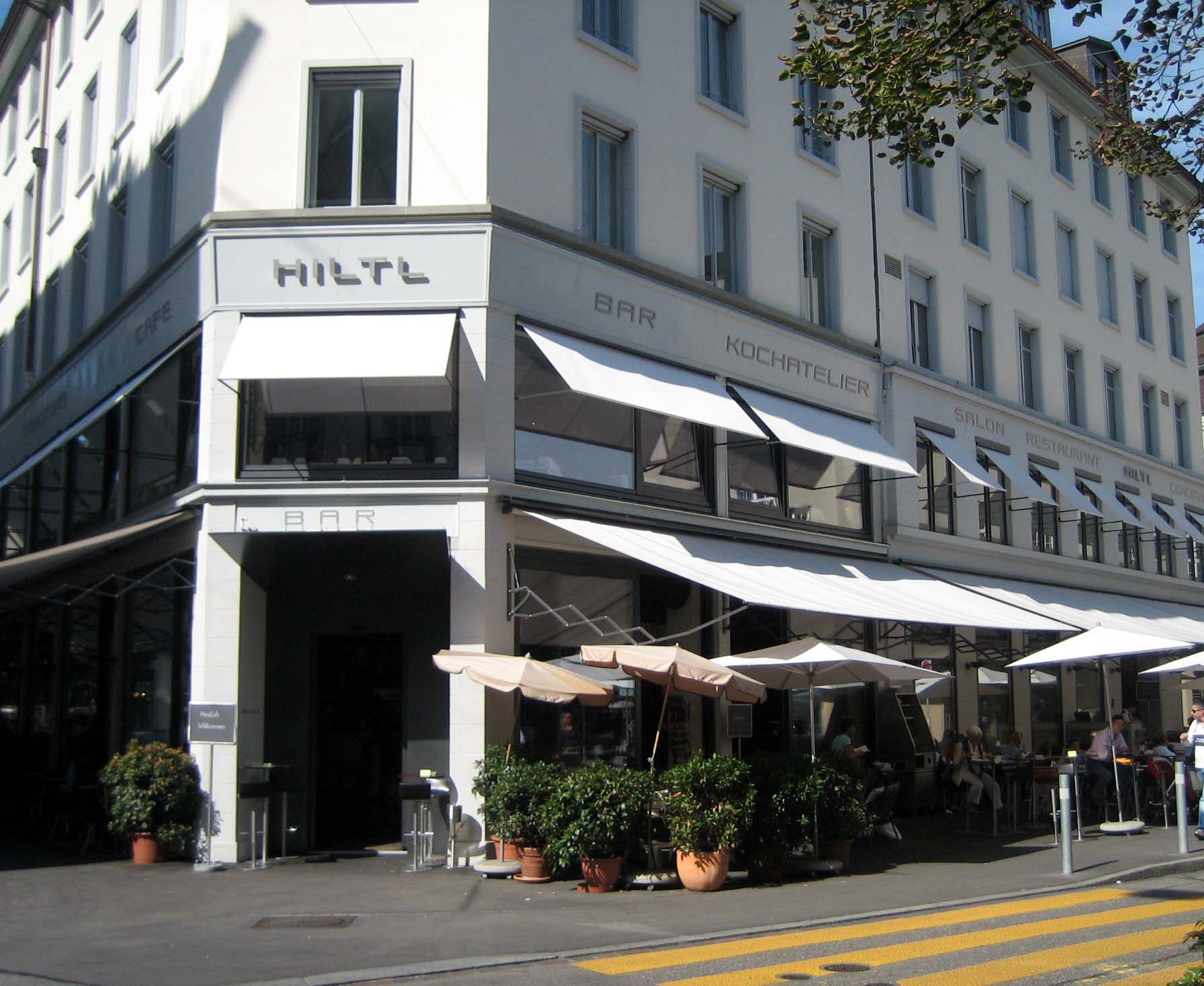
- Haus Hiltl
- Locations of Hiltl restaurants in Zurich Interactive map of Hiltl

Restaurant information
- Established: 1898
- Owner: Rolf Hiltl
- Food type: Vegetarian
- Location: Sihlstrasse 28, Zurich, 8001, Switzerland
- Coordinates: 47°22′23″N 8°32′12″E
- Other locations: Bahnhofstrasse 88, Zurich, Europaallee 1A, Zurich
- Website: hiltl.ch

Hiltl Restaurant is a vegetarian casual dining restaurant in Switzerland. The restaurant holds the Guinness world record for being the oldest continuously open vegetarian restaurant in the world. This restaurant, named Haus Hiltl, is located at Sihlstrasse in Zurich. Two others in the same city, which opened later, are the Hiltl Sihlpost at Europaallee (Kasernenstrasse, next to Main Railway Station) and the Hiltl Dachterrasse (lit. 'Hiltl roof top terrasse') in Beatengasse (near Bahnhofstrasse).

== History ==
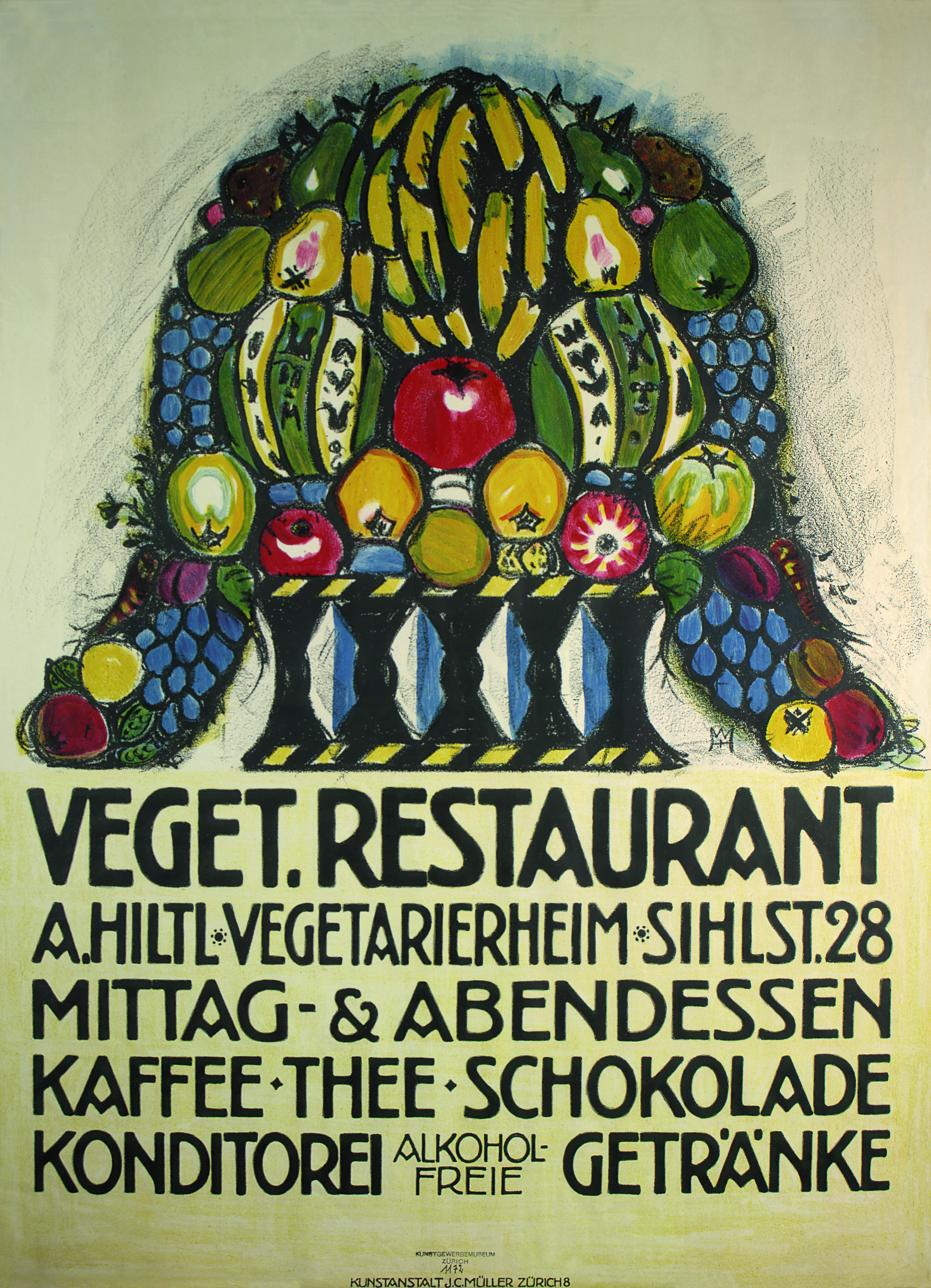
Poster from 1913

In 1898 some German immigrants founded the "Vegetaria AG." A year later the "Vegetarierheim and abstinence Café" opened at its present location at Sihlstrasse in Zurich. The restaurant was not going well: vegetarians were then denounced as "grazers".

In 1898 the German tailor Ambrosius Hiltl came to Zurich. In 1901 he became seriously ill with rheumatism and could not exercise his profession. He started to practise the vegetarian diet proposed by Maximilian Bircher-Benner, credited for coming up with the original recipe of Bircher Muesli. Hiltl dealt with the doctrine of Bircher-Benner and became a practising vegetarian.

In 1903, the Vegetarierheim AG was in economic difficulties and Ambrosius Hiltl took over as the Managing Director and revamped the place as a vegetarian restaurant. The restaurant began to run better, the daily turnover rose to 35 francs, and in 1904 Ambrosius Hiltl married Martha Gneupel and together they took over Vegetaria AG. In 1907 he bought the property with his family and became a citizen of Switzerland.

In 1931, Hiltl became the first restaurant in Zurich with an all-electric restaurant kitchen. The restaurant was eventually taken over by his sons Walter and Leonard. Significant changes came over in the menu when Leonard's wife Margrith Hiltl traveled to India, attended the vegetarian congress in New Delhi and studied Indian cuisine in great detail. She came back to include Indian cuisine in Hiltl's menu, which was very well received. Indian prime minister Morarji Desai dined at Hiltl on his official trips to Switzerland.

The restaurant was then taken over by Leonard and Margrith's son Heinz Hiltl and continued to undergo changes. The restaurant was renamed as Hiltl Vegi.

In the 1990s Heinz handed over the restaurant to his son Rolf, who revamped the restaurant digitally. He extended the opening hours to 23:00 and introduced a new wine list, which increased the popularity with the young crowd. The restaurant introduced an online reservation system and was positively reviewed on major internet sites. The net sales rose to CHF 10 million in 1998 and the restaurant released a book, Hiltl. Virtouso Vegetarian, featuring all its recipes. The book has sold several million copies and has been translated into English and French, with over 14 editions. Rolf Hiltl published a new cookbook for the 111th anniversary: Hiltl. Veggie international. A world of difference.

=== Consultation ===
In 1998, brothers Reto, Christian and Daniel Frei participated in Venture, a business plan competition organized by ETH Zurich and McKinsey & Company and presented a plan to start a high-class fast-food vegetarian restaurant. The business plan won positive feedback in the competition and they decided to implement the plan. They sought the expertise of Hiltl and collaborated with Hiltl to start Tibits, a vegetarian restaurant now operating in Basel, Bern, Zurich, Winterthur, Lausanne, Lucerne and London. The London restaurant has since closed.

== See also ==
- List of vegetarian and vegan restaurants
- List of restaurants in Switzerland
