= Europaallee Zürich =

Area in Zurich, Switzerland

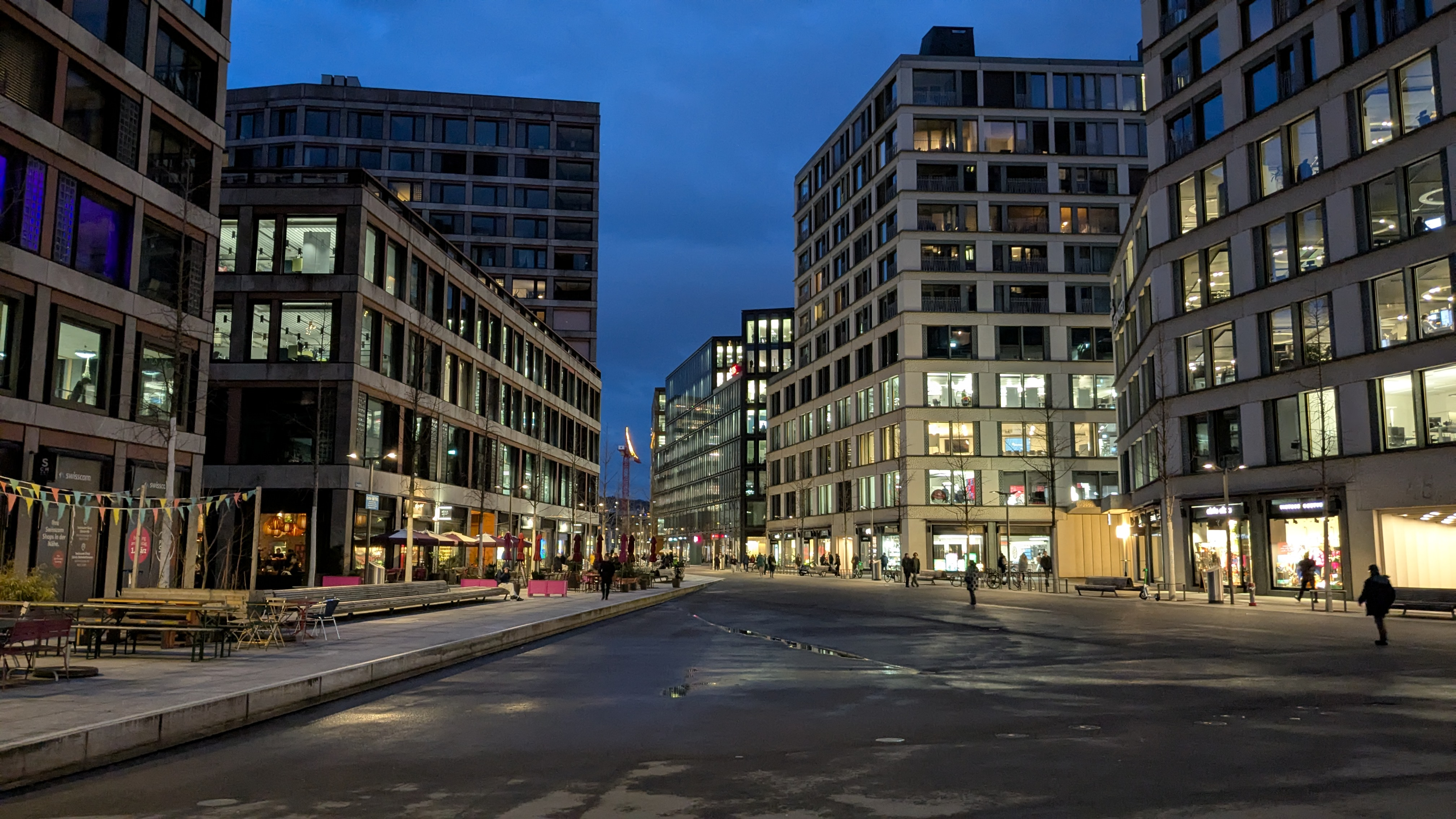
- Evening at Europaallee
- Interactive map of Europaallee Zürich
- Length: 400 m (1,300 ft)
- Postal code: 8004
- Coordinates: 47.3791°N 8.5319°E

Logo

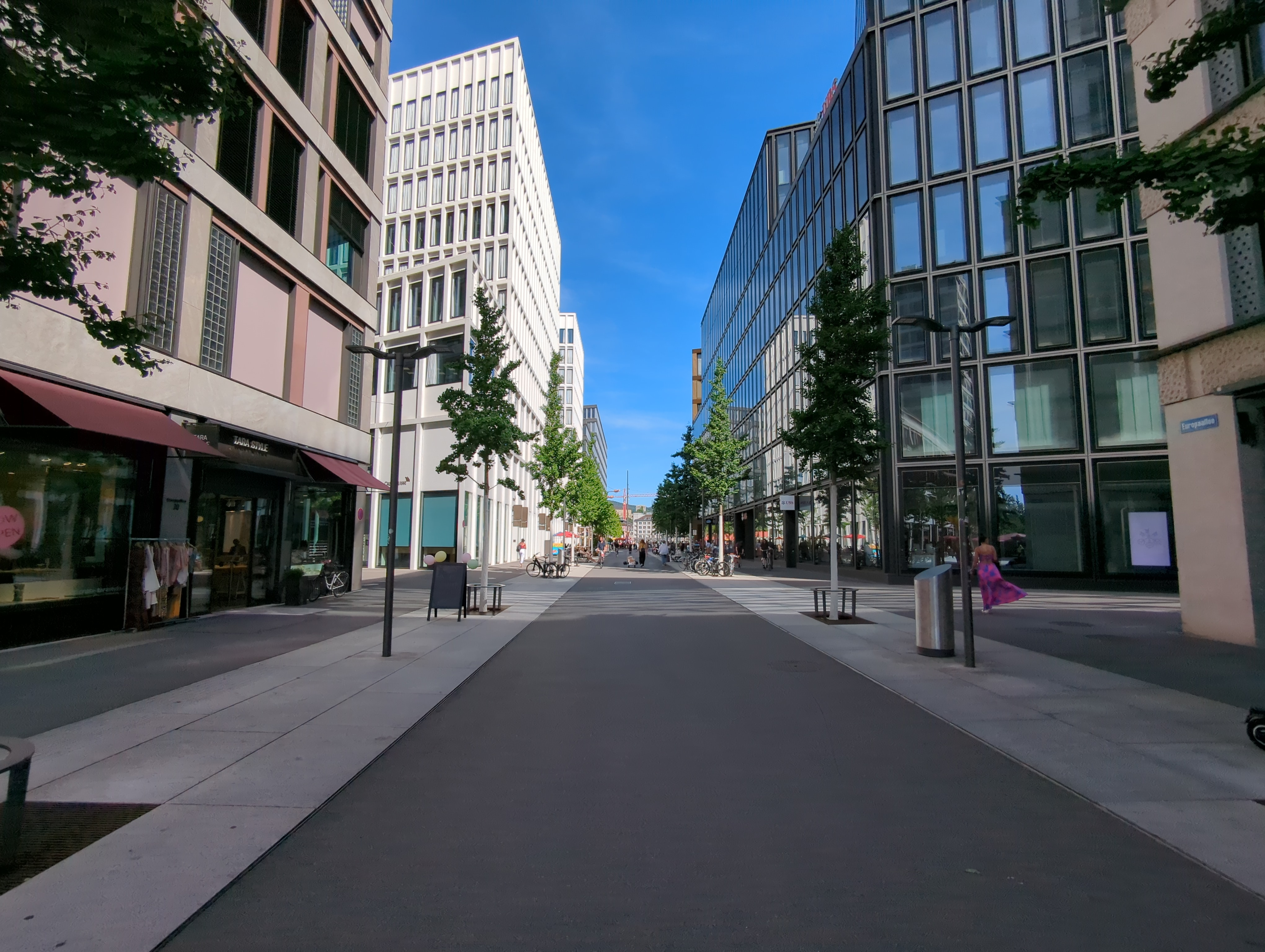
Europaallee during the day

Sihlpost, with former railway yard, and Postbrücke over the Sihl in 1971

Eurogate Zurich – originally HB-Südwest (lit. 'Central Station Southwest'), later Stadtraum HB (lit. 'urban space at central station'), and today known as Europaallee Zürich (lit. 'Europe Avenue') – is one of the urban developments on the southwest side of Zurich's Central Station (Zürich Hauptbahnhof, or Zürich HB) in Switzerland.

Located in the city's District 4, near the city centre, Europaallee was completed in 2020 and includes shops, restaurants, offices (e.g. Google), apartments, the college of education (Pädagogische Hochschule Zürich) and a hotel. Europaallee is mostly pedestrianized and features two rows of Ginkgo trees. It also includes a fountain nicknamed 'Europuddle'. The site is connected to the urban developments north of the railway tracks via a pedestrian bridge (Negrellisteg) and the western underpass of Central Station. It is linked with Bahnhofplatz, the square in front of Central Station, via Postbrücke over the river Sihl.

Before constructions began in 2009, the site was the railway yard of the Sihlpost (lit. 'Sihl postal office', built in 1930). For decades, various commercial uses were discussed for above and next to this central-Zürich site owned by the Swiss Federal Railways (SBB CFF FFS).

== Offers ==
The following shops, restaurants, hotels and companies exist, among others, at Europaallee:

- 25hours Hotel
- Adidas
- Coop
- Helsana
- Hiltl Sihlpost
- Jack Wolfskin
- Orell Füssli
- Starbucks

== Transport ==
Europaallee is adjacent to Zürich Main Station (Zürich Hauptbahnhof) and can be reached via the western underpass of the station. The nearest tram/bus stops to the east is Sihlpost/HB, served by tram lines 3 and 14 and trolleybus line 31. To the west, the closest bus stop is Militär-Langstrasse, served by trolleybus lines 31 and 32. Another bus stop served by trolleybus line 31 is Kanonengasse, which is located near Gustav-Gull-Platz at the center of the urban development.

== History ==
The previous developments under the name HB-Südwest changed to the Eurogate projects with the entrance of a new investor in October 1996 - the major Swiss bank, UBS (UBS Fund Management AG, Basel).

Also at this time, the corporation HB-Südwest, which had been founded in March 1995 with the task of working through the overall project for HB-Südwest and the residential development for the Lagerstrasse in Zurich until start of construction, was renamed as Eurogate Zürich AG. With this change, the tasks were expanded to include the developing of the entire project until its completion.

Eurogate/HB-Südwest includes two major projects in Zurich:

- Development along railway tracks, Eurogate Zürich (cost of ca. SFr 1.5 billion, planned since 1980)
- Residential Development along Lagerstrasse (Study of 2000, 350 der 500 Wohnungen sowie Büro-, Gewerbe-, Freizeitflächen und Ersatzflächen für SBB-Anlagen)

The competition for the urban planning was won by the Zurich architectural office Ralph Bänziger Architekten. In the 1970s, Luigi Snozzi and Mario Botta had participated in the original competition with a design for a slender bridge-construction over the tracks, but their project was not further developed. Ralph Bänziger proposed a massive construction along the tracks.

The work on both designs and the many changes to the project lasted from 1980 until 2001.

== See also ==
- Bahnhofstrasse
- Industriequartier
- Sihlcity
- ShopVille
