= Zürich Hauptbahnhof =

Main railway station in the Swiss city of Zurich

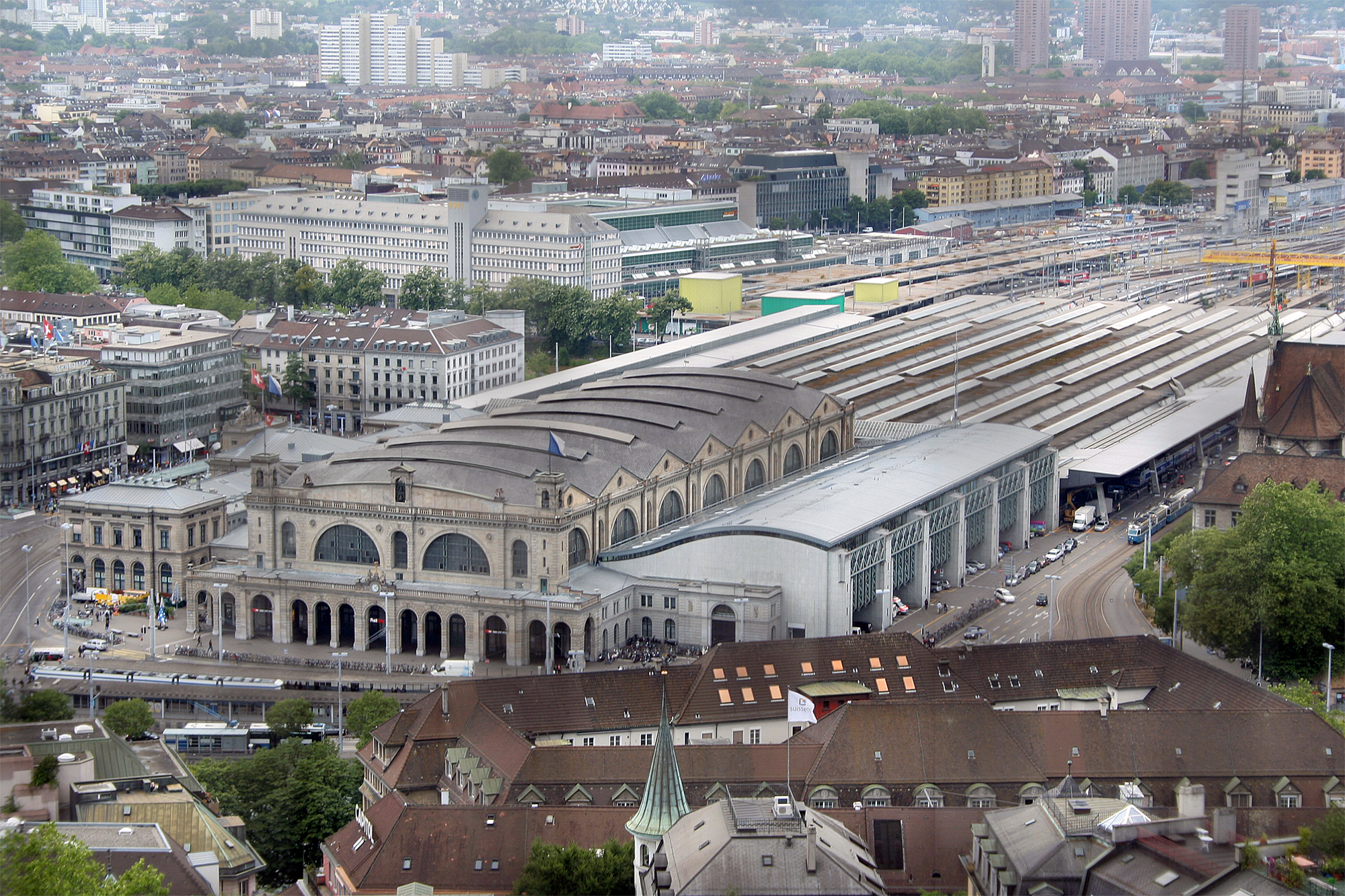
- Zürich Hauptbahnhof viewed from the east.

General information
- Other names: Zürich HB
- Location: Bahnhofplatz; 8001 Zurich; Switzerland
- Coordinates: 47°22′41″N 8°32′25″E
- Elevation: 408 m (1,339 ft)
- Owner: SBB CFF FFS (Swiss Federal Railways)
- Lines: Zurich–Brugg; Zurich–Winterthur; Lake Zurich left-bank railway; Lake Zurich right-bank railway; Zurich–Zug; Zurich–Bülach; Zurich–Wettingen
- Platforms: 13
- Tracks: 26 (16 at-grade terminal tracks; 2 underground terminal tracks; 8 underground pass-through tracks)
- Connections: ZVV: Bahnhofplatz/HB, Bahnhofstr./HB, Bahnhofquai/HB, Sihlquai/HB, Sihlpost/HB
- Ship: ZSG Limmat river cruise (Landesmuseum)
- Tram: VBZ trams 3 4 6 7 10 11 13 14 17 50 51
- Trolleybus: VBZ trolley buses 31 46

Construction
- Structure type: at-grade and underground
- Platform levels: 2 (4 passenger levels)
- Parking: limited short-term
- Cycle facilities: openair (10/1048), covered (3/214), secured (Velostation Süd: 750, Velostation Nord: 170)
- Architect: Jakob Friedrich Wanner (1871)
- Architectural style: Neo-Renaissance (1871)

Other information
- Fare zone: ZVV: 110
- Website: Zürich Hauptbahnhof

History
- Opened: 9 August 1847 (179 years ago)
- Rebuilt: 1871, 1990 (S-Bahn), 2014 (Löwenstrasse)
- Electrified: 5 February 1923

Passengers
- 2025: 449,800 per day (SBB, SOB, SZU, THURBO)
- Rank: 1 out of 1,095
Services
Preceding station	SBB CFF FFS	Following station
Terminus	EuroCity (Transalpin)	Sargans towards Graz Hbf
Terminus	EuroCity	Zug towards Bologna Centrale, Genova Piazza Principe, Milano Centrale or Venezia Santa Lucia
Terminus	EuroCity	Zurich Airport towards München Hbf
Basel SBB towards Hamburg-Altona	EuroCity	Terminus
Basel SBB towards Frankfurt (Main) Hbf	EuroCity	Reverses direction
Zug towards Milano Centrale	EuroCity	Reverses direction
Bern towards Geneva Airport	IC 1	Zurich Oerlikon towards St. Gallen
Terminus	IC 2	Zug towards Lugano
Basel SBB Terminus	IC 3	Sargans towards Chur
Terminus	IC	Schaffhausen towards Stuttgart Hbf
Aarau towards Lausanne	IC 5	Zurich Airport towards Zürich HB, St. Gallen or Rorschach
Bern towards Brig	IC 8	Zurich Airport towards Romanshorn
Bern towards Interlaken Ost	IC 81	Zurich Airport towards Romanshorn
Terminus	IR 13	Zurich Oerlikon towards Sargans
Baden towards Bern	IR 16	Terminus
Zurich Altstetten towards Basel SBB	IR 36	Zurich Oerlikon towards Zürich Airport
Lenzburg towards Basel SBB	IR 37	Terminus
Olten towards Biel/Bienne	IR 55	Terminus
Zug towards Lucerne	IR 70	Terminus
Thalwil towards Lucerne	IR 75	Zurich Airport towards Konstanz
Lenzburg towards Aarau	RE37	Terminus
Terminus	RE48	Zurich Oerlikon towards Schaffhausen
Preceding station	DB Fernverkehr	Following station
Basel SBB towards Berlin Ostbahnhof	ICE 12	Reverses direction
Sargans towards Chur	ICE 12	Reverses direction
Terminus	IC 87	Schaffhausen towards Stuttgart Hbf
Preceding station	Südostbahn	Following station
Zurich Altstetten towards Bern	IR 35 Aare Linth	Thalwil towards Chur
Terminus	IR 46	Zug towards Locarno
Preceding station	ÖBB	Following station
Terminus	Railjet Express	Sargans towards Vienna Airport
Terminus	Railjet Express	Sargans towards Bratislava hl.st.
Terminus	Railjet Express	Sargans towards Budapest Keleti
Terminus	EuroNight	Buchs SG towards Budapest Keleti
Terminus	EuroNight	Buchs SG towards Praha hl.n.
Terminus	EuroNight	Buchs SG towards Zagreb
Basel SBB towards Praha hl.n.	EuroNight	Terminus
Terminus	Nightjet	Buchs SG towards Graz Hbf
Basel SBB towards Amsterdam Centraal	Nightjet	Terminus
Basel SBB towards Hamburg-Altona	Nightjet	Terminus
Basel SBB towards Berlin Hbf	Nightjet	Terminus
Preceding station	TGV Lyria	Following station
Basel SBB towards Paris-Lyon	Paris to Zürich	Terminus
Preceding station	Zurich S-Bahn	Following station
Zurich Wiedikon towards Unterterzen	S2	Zurich Oerlikon towards Zurich Airport
Zurich Hardbrücke towards Bülach	S3	Zurich Stadelhofen towards Wetzikon
Zurich Selnau towards Sihlwald	S4 transfer at Zurich HB SZU	Terminus
Zurich Hardbrücke towards Zug	S5	Zurich Stadelhofen towards Pfäffikon SZ
Zurich Hardbrücke towards Baden	S6	Zurich Stadelhofen towards Uetikon
Zurich Hardbrücke towards Winterthur	S7	Zurich Stadelhofen towards Rapperswil
Zurich Wiedikon towards Pfäffikon SZ	S8	Zurich Oerlikon towards Winterthur
Zurich Hardbrücke towards Schaffhausen	S9	Zurich Stadelhofen towards Uster
Zurich Selnau towards Uetliberg	S10 transfer at Zurich HB SZU	Terminus
Zurich Hardbrücke towards Aarau	S11	Zurich Stadelhofen towards Seuzach or Wila
Zurich Hardbrücke towards Brugg AG	S12	Zurich Stadelhofen towards Schaffhausen or Wil
Zurich Altstetten towards Affoltern am Albis	S14	Zurich Oerlikon towards Hinwil
Zurich Hardbrücke towards Niederweningen	S15	Zurich Stadelhofen towards Rapperswil
Zurich Hardbrücke towards Zurich Airport	S16	Zurich Stadelhofen towards Herrliberg-Feldmeilen
Zurich Altstetten towards Koblenz	S19	Zurich Oerlikon towards Pfäffikon ZH
Zurich Hardbrücke towards Zürich Hardbrücke	S20	Zurich Stadelhofen towards Uerikon
Zurich Hardbrücke towards Regensdorf-Watt	S21	Terminus
Terminus	S23	Zurich Stadelhofen towards Romanshorn
Zurich Wiedikon towards Zug	S24	Zurich Wipkingen towards Thayngen or Weinfelden
Terminus	S25	Wädenswil towards Linthal
Zurich Altstetten towards Muri AG	S42	Terminus
Zurich Hardbrücke towards Aarau	SN1 Limited service	Zurich Stadelhofen towards Winterthur
Zurich Selnau towards Langnau-Gattikon	SN4 Limited service transfer at Zurich HB SZU	Terminus
Zurich Hardbrücke towards Knonau	SN5 Limited service	Zurich Stadelhofen towards Pfäffikon SZ
Zurich Hardbrücke towards Würenlos	SN6 Limited service	Zurich Stadelhofen towards Winterthur
Zurich Hardbrücke towards Bassersdorf	SN7 Limited service	Zurich Stadelhofen towards Stäfa
Zurich Wiedikon towards Lachen	SN8 Limited service	Zurich Oerlikon towards Pfäffikon ZH
Zurich Hardbrücke towards Bülach	SN9 Limited service	Zurich Stadelhofen towards Uster
Zurich Hardbrücke towards Olten	SN11 Limited service	Zurich Stadelhofen One-way operation
Location
- Location within Switzerland Location within Canton of Zurich Location within Europe

Zürich Hauptbahnhof, often shortened to Zürich HB or just HB, and known in English as Zurich Main Station, is the largest railway station in Switzerland and one of the busiest in Europe. Located at the northern end of Zurich’s Bahnhofstrasse, the station is a major railway hub, with services to and from across Switzerland and neighbouring countries such as Germany, Italy, Austria and France. The station was originally constructed as the terminus of the Spanisch Brötli Bahn, the first railway built completely within Switzerland. Serving up to 2,915 trains per day, Zürich HB is one of the busiest railway stations in the world. It was ranked as the best European railway station in 2023 and 2024.

Zürich HB is one of 29 stations in Zurich that are located within fare zone 110 of the Zürcher Verkehrsverbund (ZVV).. It is situated at the northern end of the Altstadt (lit. 'old town') and east of the Europaallee in central Zurich, near the confluence of the rivers Limmat and Sihl (the Sihl actually passes through the station in a tunnel with railway tracks both above and below). The station is on several levels, with platforms both at ground and below-ground level, tied together by underground passages and the ShopVille shopping mall. It is also connected with the Zurich HB SZU subsurface station of SZU, but shares no tracks with the latter. Zürich HB's railway yards extend about 4 km (2.5 mi) to the west.

The station is included in the Swiss Inventory of Cultural Property of National Significance.

== Location ==
Zürich Hauptbahnhof is very centrally situated at the far northern end of Bahnhofstrasse, which is one of the city's main shopping streets and flanked by many hotels.

== History ==
=== The first station ===
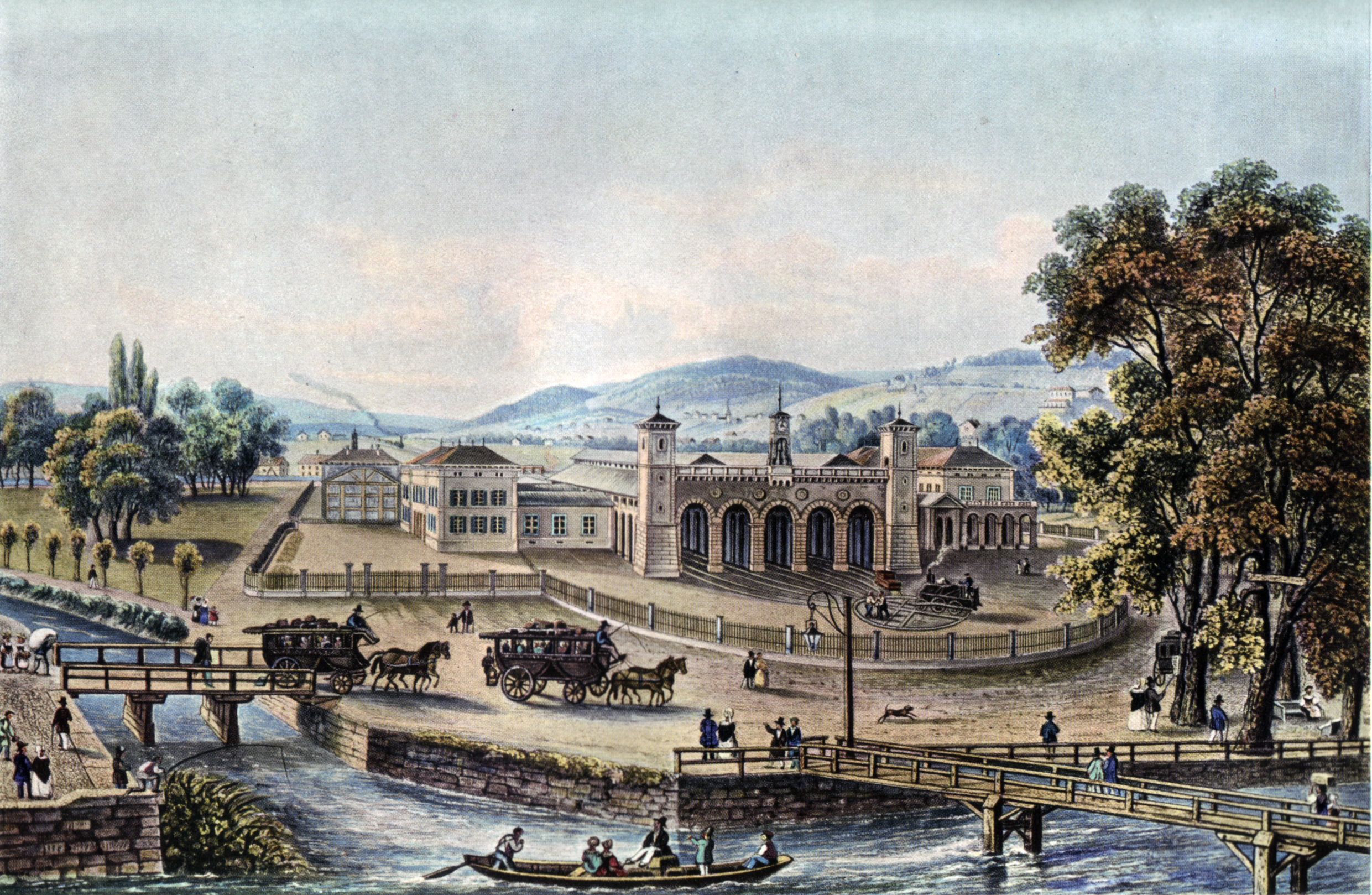
View of the first station in 1847.

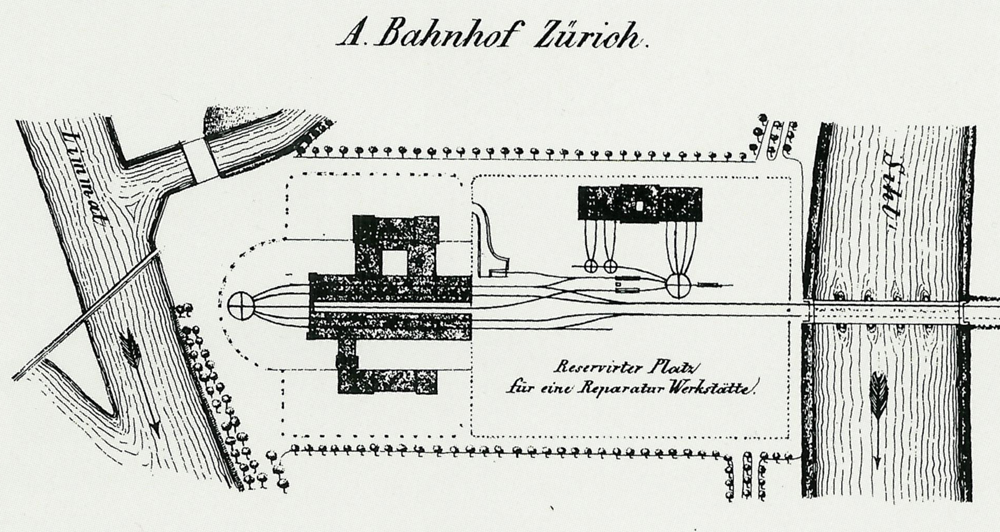
Ground plan of the first station in 1847.

The first Zurich railway station was built by Gustav Albert Wegmann, on what were then the north-western outskirts of the city. It occupied a piece of land between the rivers Limmat and Sihl, and trains accessed it from the west via a bridge over the Sihl. At the eastern end of the station was a turntable, used for turning locomotives. This basic terminal station layout, with all trains arriving from the west, was to set the basic design of the station for the next 143 years.

The new station was initially the terminus of the Swiss Northern Railway, more often called the Spanisch-Brötli-Bahn, which opened on 9 August 1847 and linked Zurich with Baden. Initially the railway lines in the station were laid to a gauge of 1,600 mm (5 ft 3 in), perhaps because the same gauge was used at the contemporaneous and nearby Grand Duchy of Baden State Railway.

From the opening of the station, the railways of northern Switzerland developed rapidly, and by 1853 the Swiss Northern Railway had been merged into the Swiss Northeastern Railway (Schweizerische Nordostbahn; NOB). Also in 1853, the tracks in the station were regauged to the standard gauge (1,435 mm or 4 ft 8 1/2 in) that is still used by all lines in the station. In 1856, the NOB completed its line from the station to Winterthur via the Wipkingen Tunnel and Oerlikon. In 1858, the NOB completed its line from Baden via Brugg to Aarau, where it connected with the Swiss Central Railway (Schweizerische Centralbahn; SCB), thus providing connections to Basel, Solothurn and Lausanne.

With further railways planned, it became clear that the 1847 station was not large enough. A rebuild was started to meet Zurich's increased transport needs, albeit on the same site and using the same basic layout.

=== The 1871 station ===
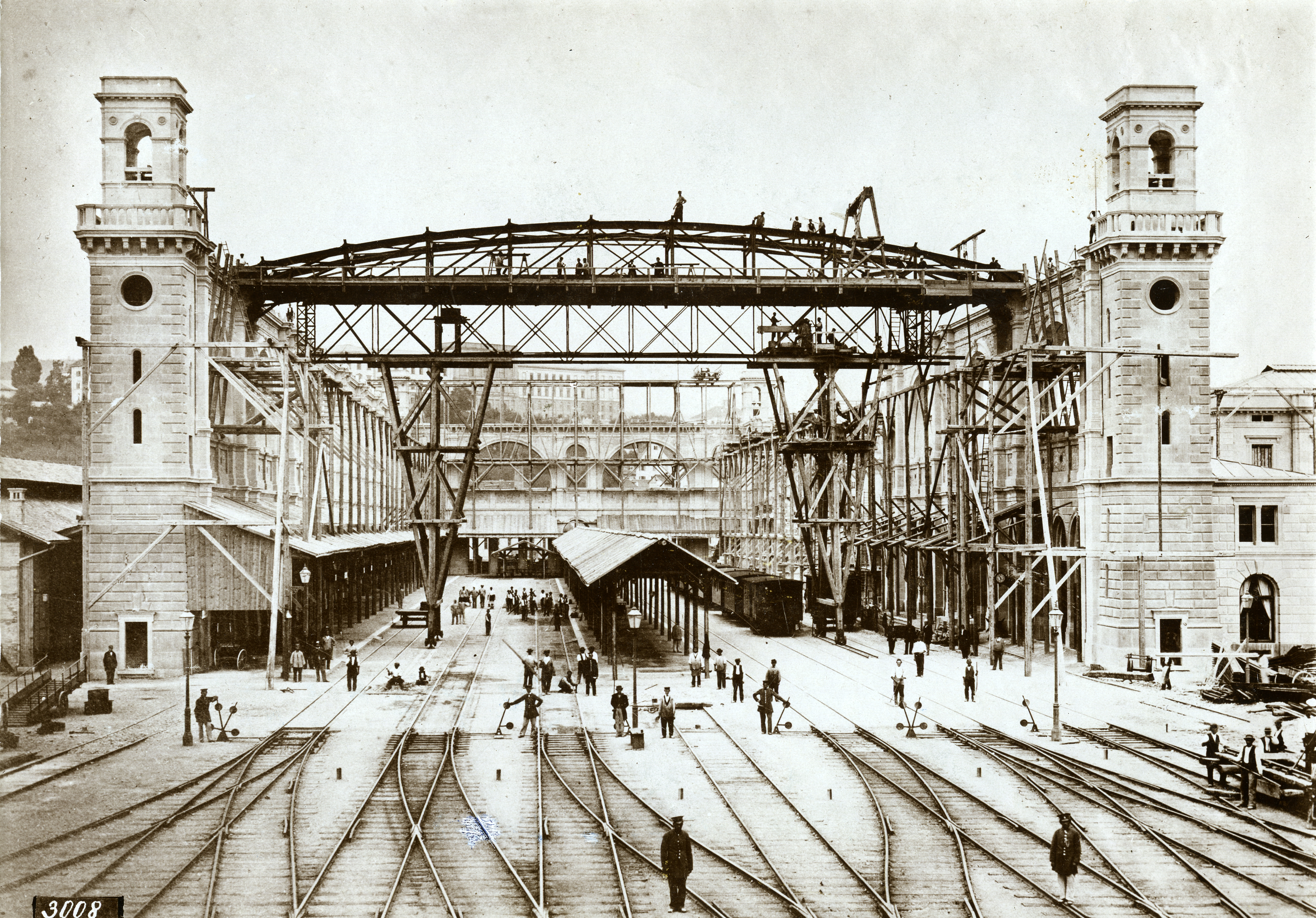
Construction of the train shed in 1870.

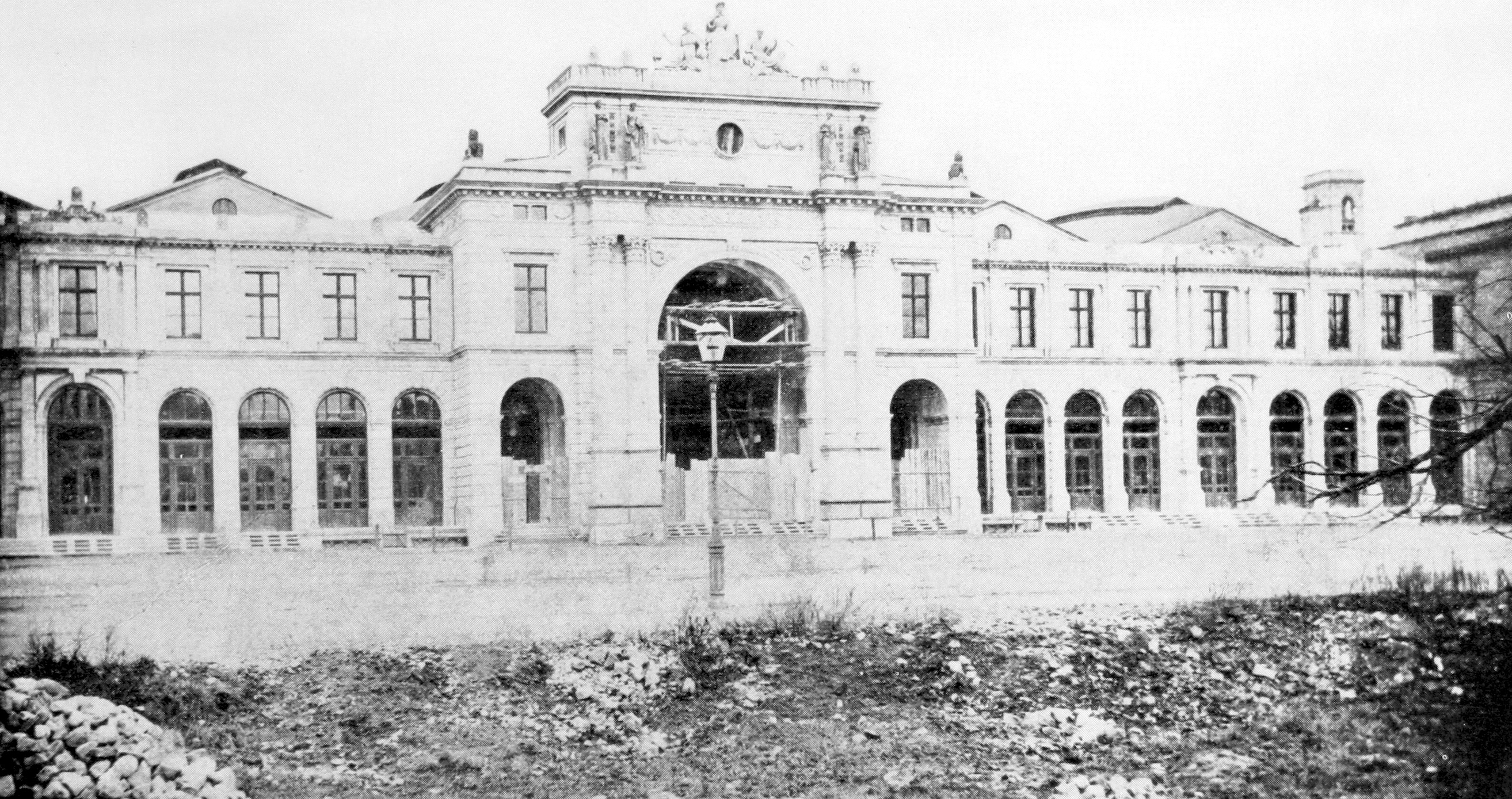
Photo of the new Bahnhof in 1871.

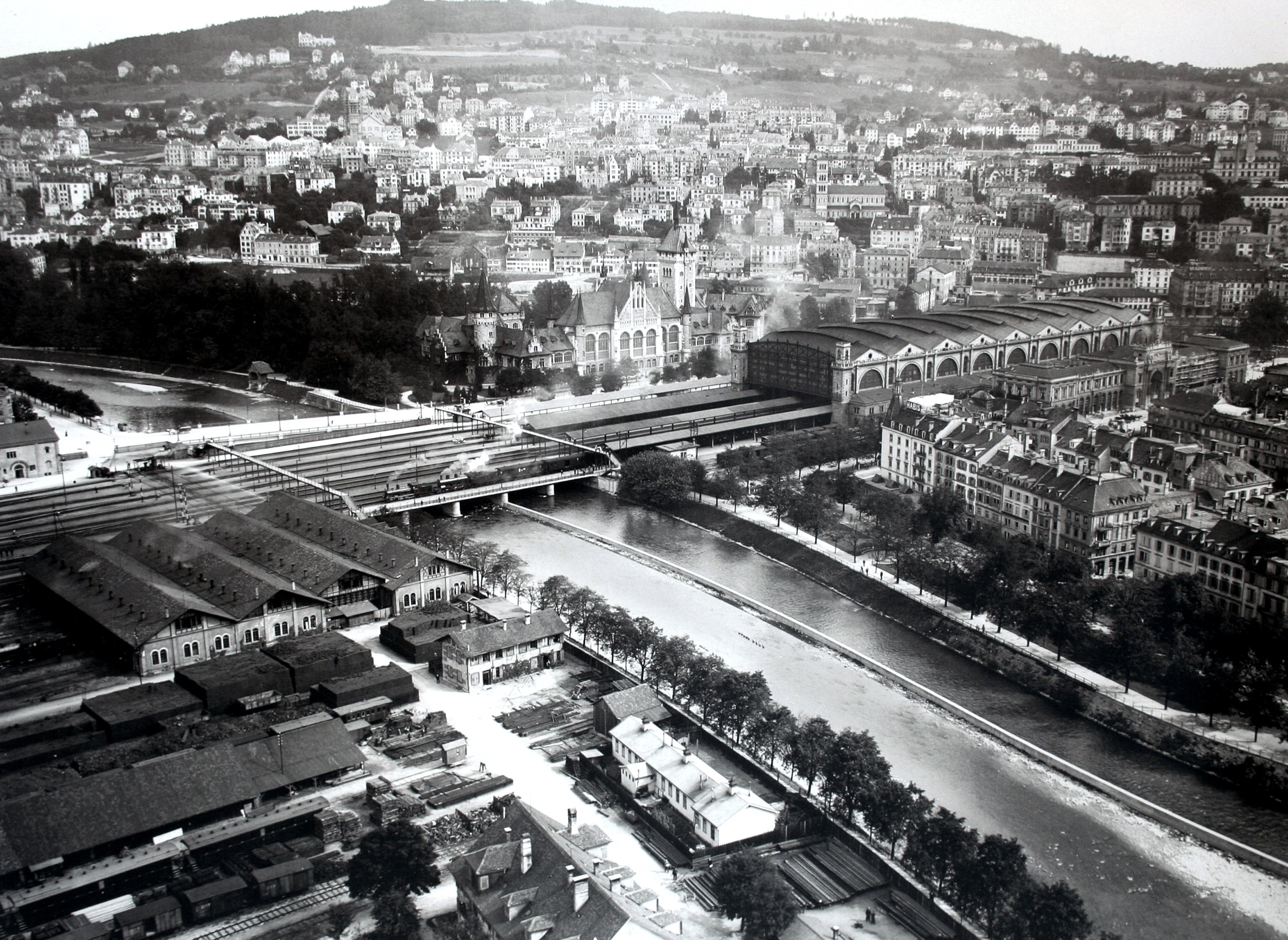
The Hauptbahnhof in a photo by Eduard Spelterini, ca. 1907.

In 1871, the replacement station building opened, to a design by architect Jakob Friedrich Wanner. Its main entrance is a triumphal arch facing the end of the then newly built Bahnhofstrasse. In front of the arch stands a monument to the railway pioneer Alfred Escher. The magnificent sandstone neo-Renaissance building features richly decorated lobbies and atriums, restaurants and halls. Originally housed inside it was the headquarters of the Schweizerische Nordostbahn (NOB). The train shed, spanned by iron trusses, initially covered six tracks.

The station was named Zürich Hauptbahnhof in 1893, to reflect that year's incorporation of many of Zurich's suburbs into an enlarged municipality. In 1902, the year in which the Swiss Federal Railways (SBB) took over the Schweizerische Centralbahn and the NOB, the tracks inside the eastern end of the train shed were lifted, due to a lack of space. Since then, these tracks have terminated at a more central location, immediately to the north of the Bahnhofstrasse. Also in 1902, four more tracks and a north wing with a restaurant and railway mail service were added to the north of the train shed. In the vacant space left inside the train shed, new rooms were built for baggage handling.

On 18 February 1916, the SBB decided that electrification of its network would be by the high-tension single-phase alternating current system that is still used on all routes. On 5 February 1923, the electrified Zug–Zurich railway was put into operation, the first electrified line to Zurich. By 1927 all routes from Zürich Hauptbahnhof had been electrified.

In 1933, the station's simple concourse and the iron and glass train shed were created with seven and a half arches to cover 16 tracks. As part of that work, the main shed was shortened by two segments.

In the 1940s, the line between Zurich and Geneva served as a "parade route". The first lightweight steel express train had entered service on this route in 1937. By 11 June 1960, the SBB network was largely electrified. In the following year, the SBB introduced its first four-system electric trains under the Trans Europ Express banner, and thereby increased Zürich Hauptbahnhof's international importance.

In 1963, about 500 metres before the concourse, an imposing six-storey concrete cube arose in the station yard. It was designed by SBB architect Max Vogt, and it has been the home of the Zentralstellwerk Zürich (central signalling control) since 1966. The then state-of-the-art relay-controlled interlocking system replaced the decentralised mechanical and electro-mechanical signal boxes in the station throat, including the Stellwerk «Seufzerbrücke» ("Bridge of Sighs" signal box), which had spanned the entire station throat just east of the Langstrasse.

The signalling control system was modernised to coincide with the commissioning of the Zurich S-Bahn. It is equipped with a computerised controller that performs the standard operations. Apart from the tracks and points (switches) of the "Sihlpost station" (which are controlled by an electronic control system), the entire control of the points and signals in the Langstrasse–Concourse section is still largely under relay control, in some cases with the original relay sets installed in 1966.

The immense station yard, with its platform tracks and station building, is a bottleneck for the city of Zurich. The Limmat and the Sihl were further bottlenecks, and the combination of the three led to gridlock in the 1950s and 1960s. In parallel, there were plans for a subway system. Although the people voted against it in 1962, the city's Civil Engineering Department had already started to convert the Bahnhofplatz for the purpose of a possible underground line.

=== ShopVille and S-Bahn ===
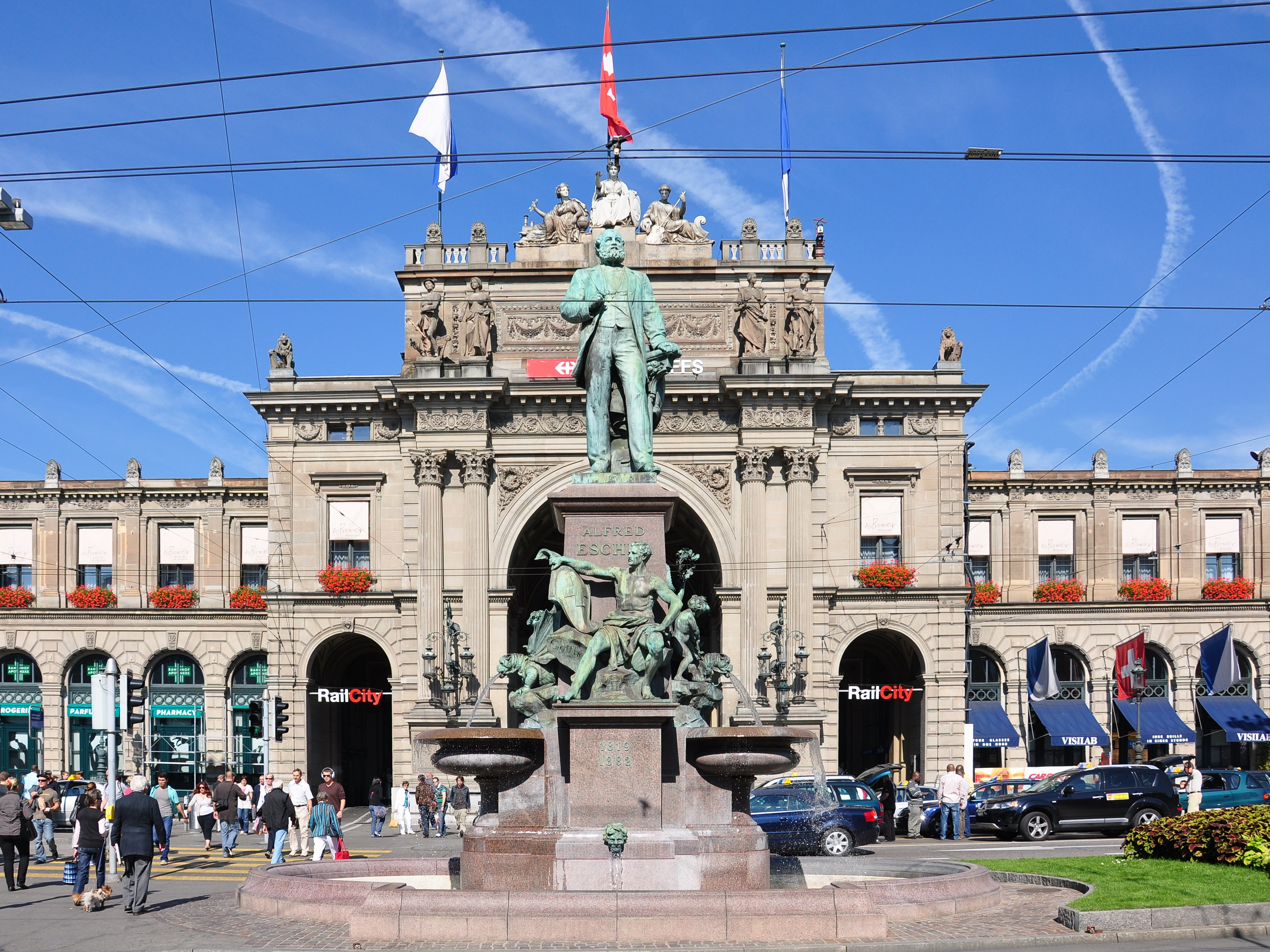
View from the Bahnhofstrasse, with Richard Kissling's monumental fountain depicting Alfred Escher in the foreground.

On 1 October 1970, construction of the Bahnhofplatz, as well as the pedestrian and shopping arcade ShopVille was completed. Upon its opening, the Bahnhofplatz became a pedestrian-free zone, and the underground ShopVille the only access to the station. Contrary to expectations, ShopVille did not capture the support of the people, who, in 1973, voted even more emphatically to reject a subway system.

In the 1980s, ShopVille became a drug-dealing hub, due to its proximity to the Autonomes Jugendzentrum Zürich (lit. 'Autonomous Youth Center Zurich'). Its low point was reached at the end of the decade, when travellers avoided all parts of it other than the concourse and the tram stop. Consequently, there were several night-time closures by mesh fences. However, the solution to this problem was foreseeable, as the people had agreed on 29 November 1981 to the construction of the Zurich S-Bahn and the extension of the Sihltal Zürich Uetliberg Bahn to the Hauptbahnhof.

The 2.1 km (1.3 mi) long Hirschengraben Tunnel was built for the S-Bahn from the Hauptbahnhof to Zurich Stadelhofen. This new line continued through the Zürichberg Tunnel to Stettbach, with connections to the existing lines to Dietlikon and Dübendorf. In the Hauptbahnhof, two underground stations were constructed. For the S-Bahn, a four-track station with the working title Museumstrasse was built, and the Sihltal Zürich Uetliberg Bahn was extended to the Zurich HB SZU station, which had once been intended for the never-realized U-Bahn.

The opening of the S-Bahn was on 27 May 1990, and since then, the ShopVille arcades have connected the two underground stations with the main hall. Black and white striped marble walls and granite floors are the main design features of what is one of the largest shopping centres in Switzerland. In 1996, the main hall was cleared of its temporary installations. In 1997, the train shed was fitted on both sides with pitched roofs on sloping concrete supports, designed by local architects Marcel Meili and Markus Peter.

=== Löwenstrasse station ===
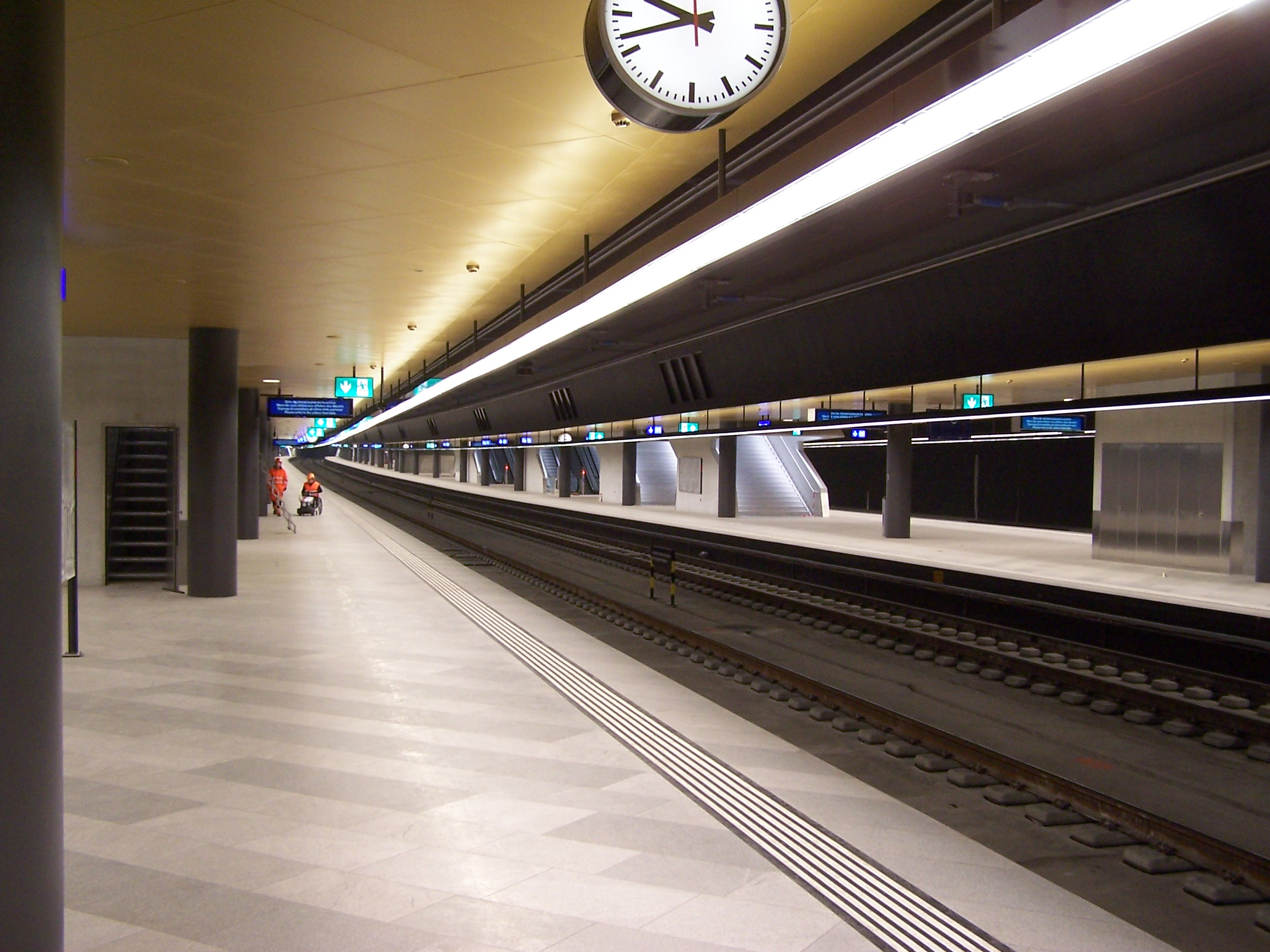
Löwenstrasse station in March 2014

The planning of the S-Bahn and the Rail 2000 long-haul project raised the idea of building the Weinberg Tunnel, a through route from Zürich Hauptbahnhof to Oerlikon. That proposal was initially postponed, but the great success of the S-Bahn led to an expansion of services and, consequently, to capacity constraints. Plans were made to expand existing rail lines within Zurich leading to the north, but this encountered resistance from the population living near those rail lines. As an alternative the construction of the Weinberg tunnel and four additional underground tracks in the railway station was suggested and confirmed by a referendum.

In 2002, an architectural competition was held for the new Löwenstrasse transit station, won by the architect Jean-Pierre Dürig. On 22 December 2006, the Federal Office of Transport approved the building of the tunnel and a third underground four-track Löwenstrasse station. In September 2007, construction began on the project, nicknamed Durchmesserlinie (cross-city link). On 14 June 2014, the new platforms and tunnels were opened.

The new line runs from the Altstetten railway station, crosses the Zürich HB station throat on a bridge, and leads into the underground Löwenstrasse station. From there, it goes through the new, approximately 5 km (3.1 mi) long Weinberg Tunnel in a long left-hand curve under the existing Zürich HB–Stadelhofen line. It then ends at the level of the portals of the existing Wipkinger Tunnels in Oerlikon, where it connects with the northbound lines, including the line to Zurich Airport and Winterthur.

In 2007, the SBB and Deutsche Bahn entered into a station partnership between the Zürich HB and the Berlin Hauptbahnhof to promote knowledge sharing between operators of similarly sized stations.

As of the mid-2020s, Zürich Hauptbahnhof was the busiest railway station in Switzerland. For five consecutive years to 2025, the Consumer Choice Center ranked it as Europe's best performing rail hub.

== Layout and facilities ==
=== Layout ===
The station is aligned approximately east to west, at the northern edge of the city centre and the northern end of Bahnhofstrasse, the city's main shopping street, and Bahnhofplatz. North of the station are the Platzspitz park, the Swiss National Museum (Landesmuseum) and a terminal for intercity buses. East of the station is the river Limmat with two bridges, the Walchebrücke and the Bahnhofbrücke.

The station is split over three principal levels, with the ground level housing sixteen terminal platform tracks, flanked by the Zollbrücke and Postbrücke, and the station's main concourse. Below this level are a series of pedestrian passageways, the ShopVille shopping centre, and the course of the Sihl river. At the lowest level, and parallel to the terminal platforms at ground level, are ten underground platform tracks, of which two are terminal (Gleis 21–22) and eight are through (Gleis 31–34, 41–44).

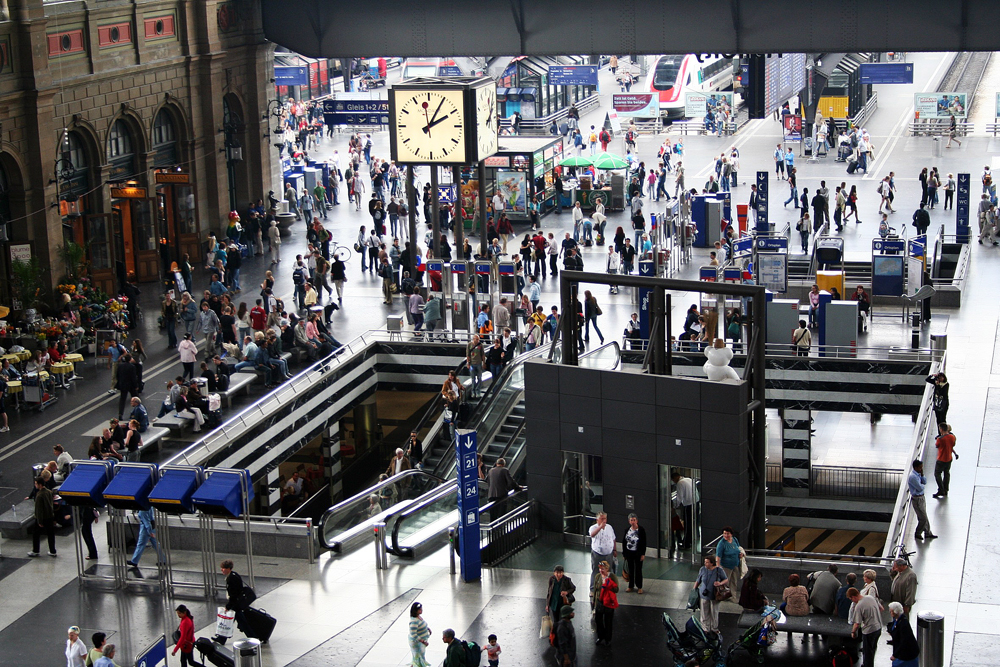
View down into the busy Haupthalle, with the Querhalle and surface platforms just visible at top of shot

The station's main concourse itself comprises two sections. To the east is the Haupthalle (lit. 'Main Hall'), which was the train hall of the 1871 station but is now a pedestrian circulation space, sometimes also used for events and exhibits. The Haupthalle is surrounded on three sides by station buildings, whilst to the west it opens onto the Querhalle (lit. 'Cross Hall'), which stretches across the head of the ground level terminal platforms. These platforms, comprising two side platforms and seven island platforms, are sheltered by the 1933-built train shed and are served by tracks (German: Gleis) numbered 3 to 18.

At the subterranean middle level, the station site is crossed north to south by four pedestrian passageways (Passage). The eastern three of these, the Passage Bahnhofstrasse, the Passage Löwenstrasse and the Passage Gessnerallee, form an interconnected complex with the ShopVille shopping complex and give direct access to all the station's platforms as well as to the surrounding streets. An intermediate underground level, immediately below the Haupthalle, connects these passageways with the concourse. The westernmost passage, the Passage Sihlquai, lies to the west of the Sihl, which passes under the station from north to south at the same level as the passageways. Because of the presence of the river channel, the Sihlquai passage has no direct connection to the other passageways, but it connects to streets to the north and south of the station, and to all platforms except that serving tracks 21 and 22.

At the lowest level, there are three groups of underground platforms. The most southerly are terminal tracks 21 and 22 of the Zurich HB SZU station, with a single island platform, and accessible only to trains on the SZU's Sihltal (S4) and Uetliberg (S10) lines. To the north of these are two island platforms serving tracks 31 to 34, known as the Löwenstrasse station, which link to the station's western and southern rail approaches, and to an eastern approach via the Weinberg tunnel from Oerlikon station. Some distance to the north of these are two further island platforms serving tracks 41 to 44, known as the Museumstrasse station, which also link to the station's western and northern approaches, and to an eastern approach via the Hirschengraben Tunnel from Stadelhofen station.

=== Facilities ===
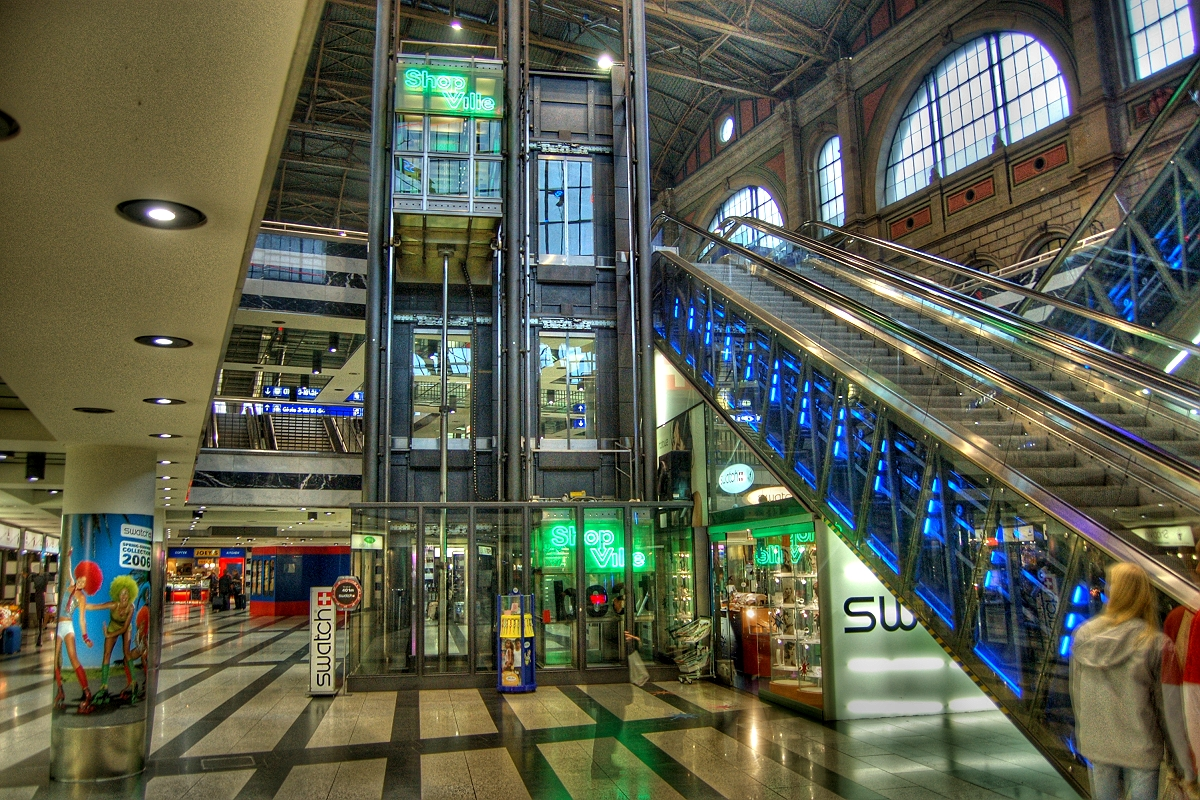
ShopVille mall

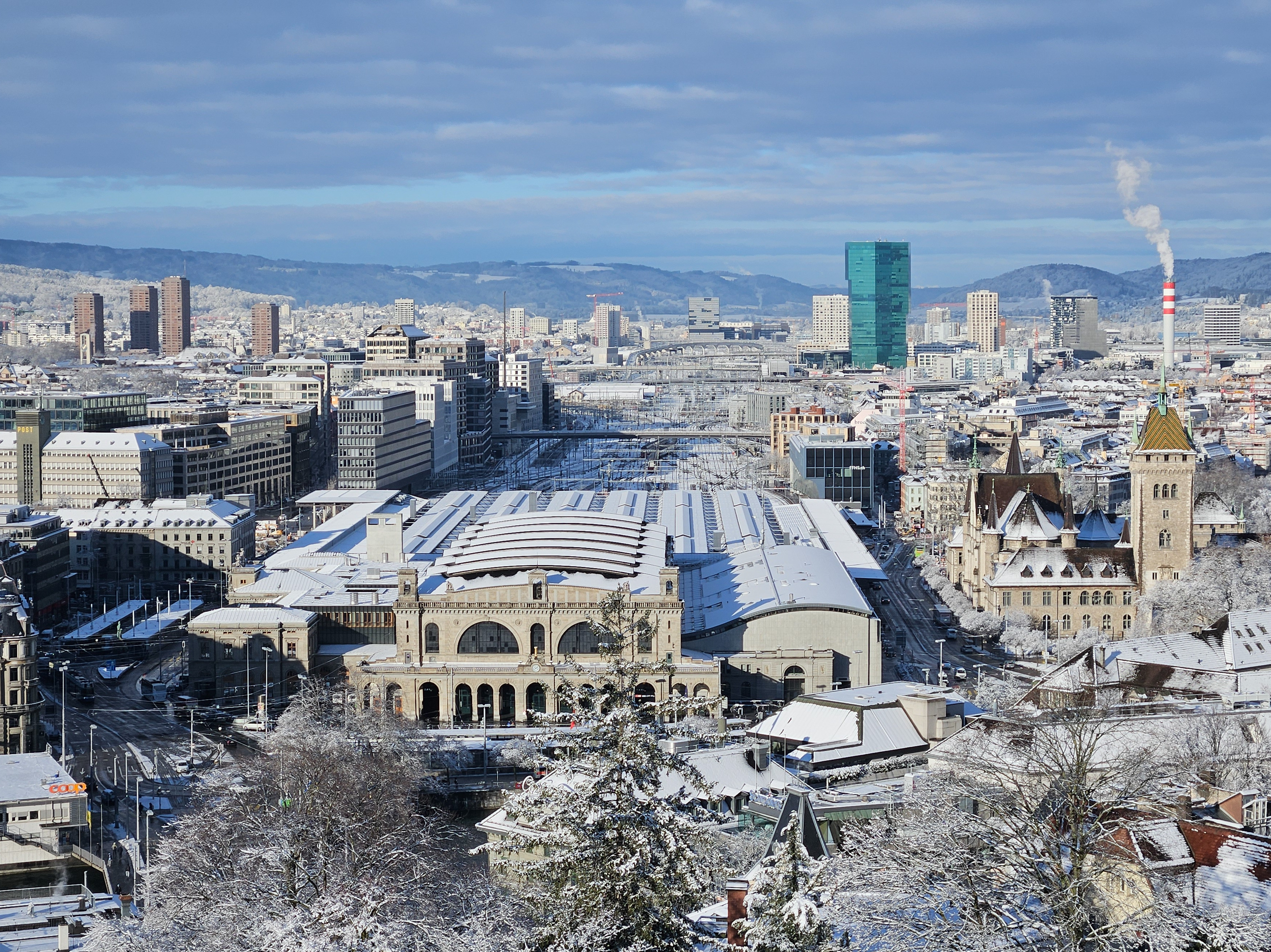
Station in 2024, Europaallee on the left

Underneath the Bahnhofplatz and the station is the large underground shopping centre called "ShopVille" of over 200 shops or other businesses. It benefits from the Swiss employment law rule that while generally labour on Sundays is not allowed, it is allowed in "centres of public transport". The huge underground "Rail City" is, therefore, usually bustling on Sundays even while the streets of Zurich are largely empty.

The western underpass (between Sihlpost and Sihlquai) also contains shops and take aways. Between 2018 and 2023, the south wing of the station building, facing Bahnhofplatz, was renovated. It features shops, restaurants and ticket offices.

As of the mid-2020s, the food outlets inside the station included the flashy Brasserie Süd near the Bahnhofstrasse entrance, the grander Brasserie Federal, and, opposite the latter, the more casual Café Oscar.

Events take place regularly in the Haupthalle, including "open air" cinema; vegetable, flea and Christmas markets; and events such as skating, beach volleyball and the "warm up" for the Street Parade.

The station also has its own chapel, jointly run by the Evangelical Reformed and the Roman Catholic churches, but open to travellers of all denominations or religions. The chapel is located on the intermediate underground level, immediately below the Haupthalle.

From 8 June 2009, Zürich HB was the site of the first SBB Lounge. This waiting room was exclusively for holders of a first-class general subscription or a valid international first-class ticket or for frequent traveller program members of the Railteam partner railways. However, it was closed in 2016.

Between 2009 and 2020, the Europaallee building complex was constructed on the former rail yard of the Sihlpost, located west of the Zürich HB station building. The site features several shops, restaurants and offices. The Europaallee is connected with the area north of the railway tracks via the Negrellisteg (lit. 'Negrelli pedestrian bridge'), which opened in 2021, and with the station's platforms via the western underpass.

=== Station bells, clock and lights ===
There are station bells above the rear exit of the large hall. In the 1847 station, bells rang before each departure of the Spanisch-Brötli-Bahn. The signal order prescribed as follows: "10 minutes before the departure of a train, one [bell]; 5 minutes before the same, two [bells]; and immediately prior to departure, three bells". For the 1871 renovations, the architect Jakob Friedrich Wanner gave the station clock the place of honour in the portal above the main entrance, and the bells were placed in a small tower in the east facade.

On 12 September 2006, to commemorate the station's 150th anniversary, the ETH Zurich installed the NOVA, a three-dimensional, bivalent display, which consists of 25,000 individually addressable light balls. It represents a play of light of several colours, but can also represent cinematic sequences. It is expected to remain hanging in the station until further notice.

== Operation ==
Zürich HB is one of the world's busiest railway stations, serving over 2,900 trains daily. As a central nexus of Swiss and international rail transit, the station maintains continuous traffic, with regional train services running from 05:00 until 01:00 nightly. From Friday night to Sunday morning, a comprehensive 24-hour service is maintained across the network via the Zürcher Verkehrsverbund (ZVV) Nachtnetz night-train infrastructure.

=== Tracks ===
The station has four distinct groups of tracks (Gleis), giving a total of 26 tracks:

- Tracks 3–18 are terminal tracks located at ground level, served by two side platforms and seven island platforms. These are used by long-distance trains from throughout Switzerland, and by international trains such as the EuroCity, Cisalpino, InterCityExpress and TGV. A few S-Bahn services (S21, S24, S25, S42) also depart from these tracks.
- Tracks 21 and 22 are underground station tracks located in the terminal section known as Zürich HB SZU. They are Sihltal Zürich Uetliberg Bahn (SZU) for standard S-Bahn services S4 and S10 heading south toward the Sihl valley and Uetliberg. From 26 April until 11 October 2026, these tracks were completely closed to all train traffic for a comprehensive 24-week modernization project to install an upgraded smoke extraction system and raise the platform edges to 55 cm for barrier-free level boarding (BehiG). During this period, all SZU services were truncated to terminate early at Zurich Selnau station.
- Tracks 31–34 (Löwenstrasse station) are underground through tracks, served by a pair of island platforms, and located just to the north of tracks 21 and 22. These are used by long-distance trains and S-Bahn services S2 S8 S14 and S19 running to and from Oerlikon station via the Weinberg Tunnel.
- Tracks 41–44 (Museumstrasse station) are underground through tracks, served by a pair of island platforms, and located on the northern side of the station. These are used by S-Bahn trains running via the Hirschengraben Tunnel and Zurich Stadelhofen station (services S3, S5, S6, S7, S9, S11, S12, S15, S16, S20, S23).
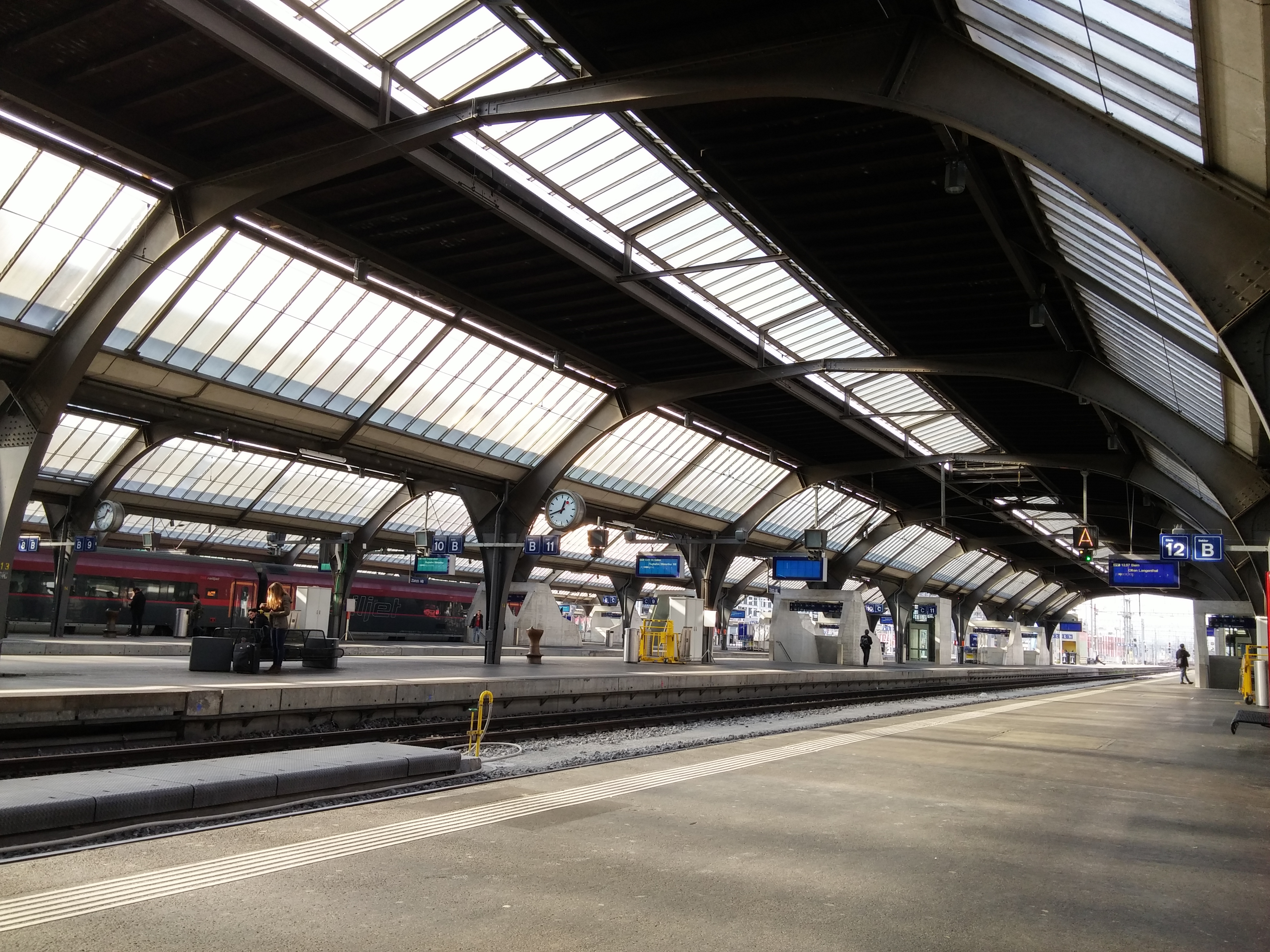
The surface platforms (tracks 3–18)

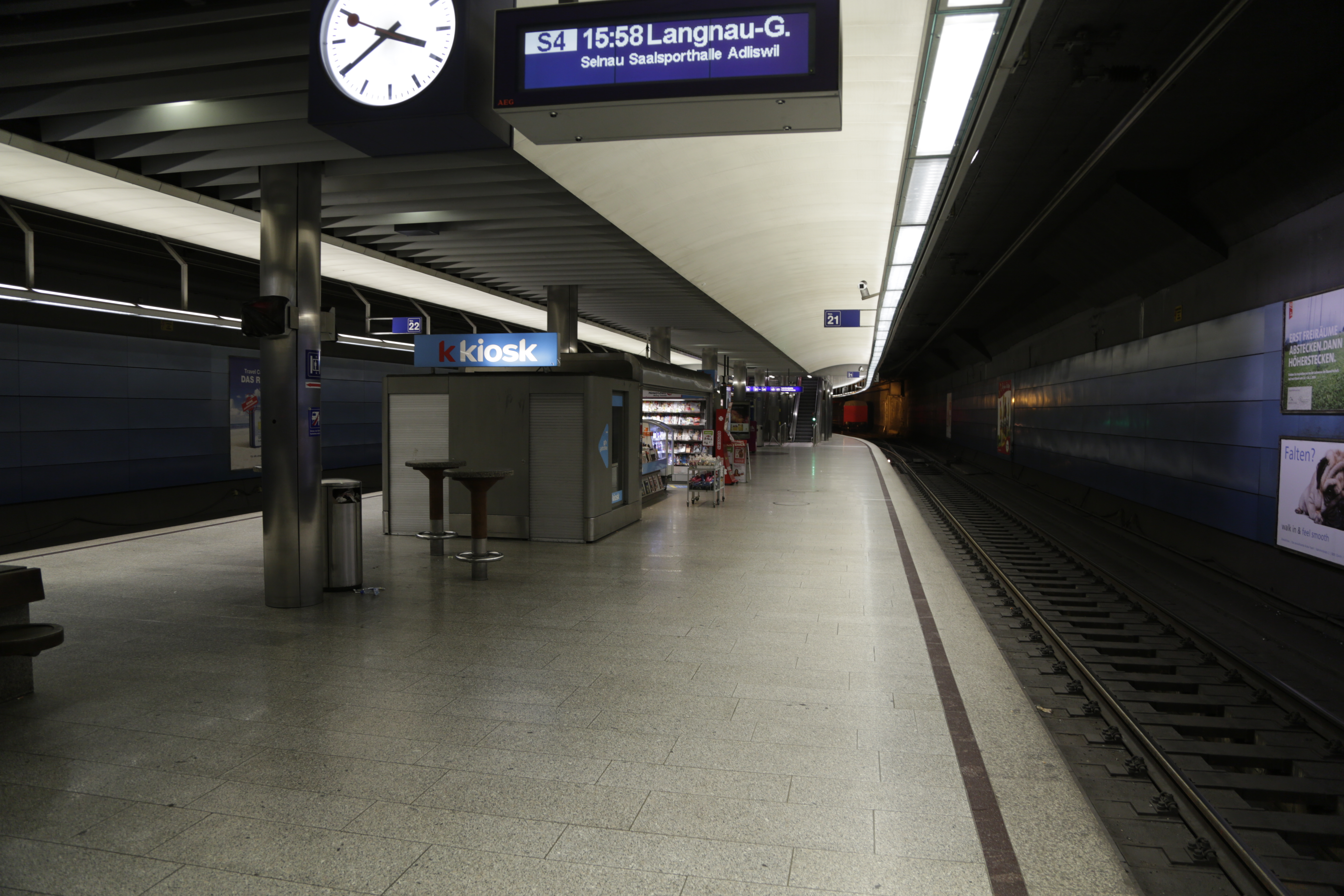
The Zurich HB SZU platform (tracks 21–22)

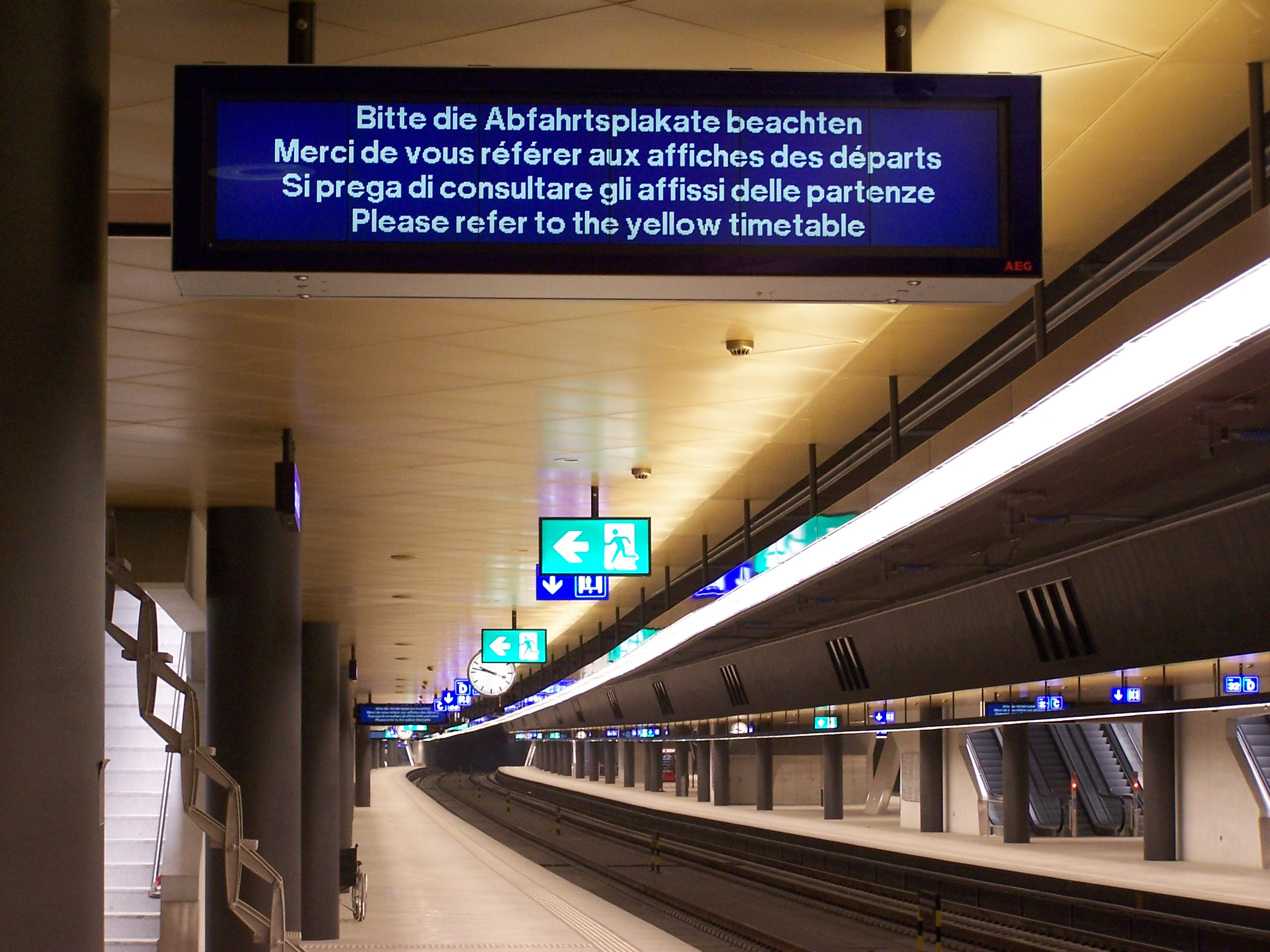
The Löwenstrasse platforms (tracks 31–34)

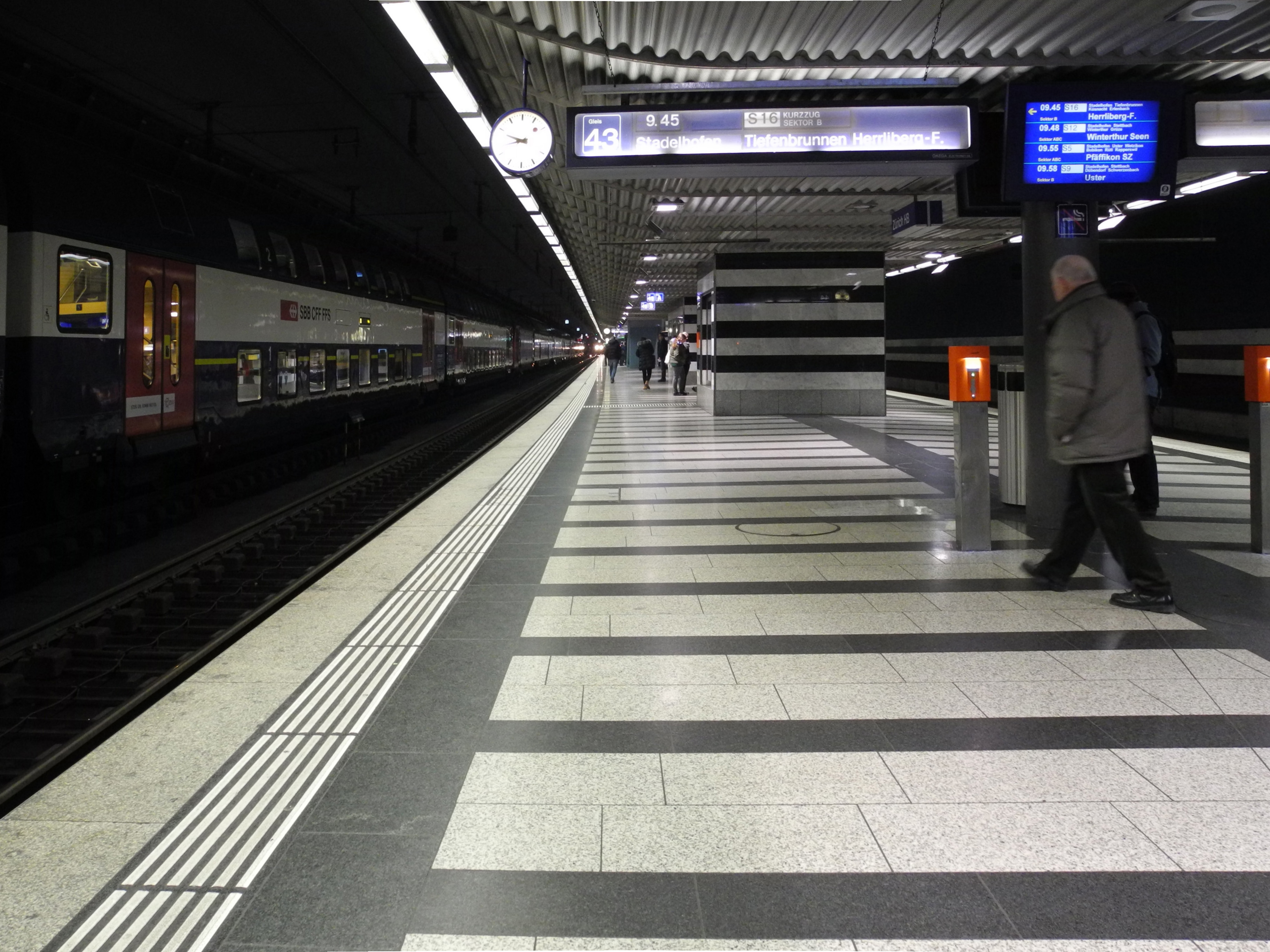
The Museumstrasse platforms (tracks 41–44)

=== International services ===
As of the December 2025 timetable change, the following international services stop at Zürich HB:

- Intercity Express: four trains per day to Chur; individual trains to Hamburg-Altona, Berlin Ostbahnhof, Köln, and Frankfurt (Main).
- TGV Lyria: six trains per day to Paris.
- EuroCity:
  - Transalpin: single train per day to Graz.
  - Twelve trains per day to Milano Centrale; one train continues to Venice and another to Florence.
  - Seven trains per day to Munich.
  - Single train per day to Frankfurt (Main).
- InterCity: hourly service to Stuttgart.
- InterRegio: hourly service to Konstanz
- Railjet Express: Five trains per day to Vienna, Budapest, or Bratislava.
- Nightjet / EuroNight:
  - Overnight train to Amsterdam.
  - Overnight train to Graz, Vienna, Prague, Budapest, and Zagreb.

=== Domestic long-distance traffic ===
As of the December 2025 timetable change, the following domestic long-distance services stop at Zürich HB:

- EuroCity/InterCity: hourly to half-hourly service to Lugano (EuroCity continues to Milano).
- InterCity:
  - half-hourly service between St. Gallen and Lausanne and hourly service to Rorschach and Geneva Airport.
  - hourly service to Basel SBB and half-hourly service to Chur.
  - hourly service to Biel/Bienne.
  - hourly service between Spiez and Romanshorn; service every two hours from Spiez to Brig and Interlaken Ost.
- InterRegio:
  - two trains per hour to Bern.
  - hourly service between Basel SBB and Zurich Airport.
  - half-hourly service to Chur and hourly service to Basel SBB.
  - half-hourly service to Lucerne
  - service every two hours to Locarno.
- RegioExpress:
  - hourly service to Schaffhausen.
  - hourly service to Aarau.

=== S-Bahn services ===
Since the commissioning of the Zurich S-Bahn in May 1990, the Hauptbahnhof has been the central node of the Zurich S-Bahn Stammnetz (core network). As such, it is the nodal point where S-Bahn lines S2, S3, S5, S6, S7, S8, S9, S12, S14, S15, S16, S19, S20, S21, S24 and S25, the Sihltal Zürich Uetliberg Bahn (S4 and S10) and Zurich trams interconnect.

- S2 Zürich Flughafen –Oerlikon–Zürich HB–Thalwil–Pfäffikon SZ–Ziegelbrücke
  Stops between Zürich Enge and Ziegelbrücke only in Thalwil, Horgen, Wädenswil, Richterswil, Pfäffikon SZ, Altendorf, Lachen and Siebnen-Wangen.
- S3 (Bülach–) Hardbrücke–Zürich HB–Effretikon–Wetzikon
  Extended from Hardbrücke to Bülach during rush hour, operating non-stop from Glattbrugg.
- S5 Zug–Affoltern am Albis–Zürich HB–Uster–Wetzikon–Rapperswil–Pfäffikon SZ
  Stops between Stadelhofen and Wetzikon only in Uster.
- S6 Baden AG–Regensdorf-Watt–Hardbrücke–Zürich HB–Uetikon
- S7 Winterthur–Kloten–Hardbrücke–Zürich HB–Meilen–Rapperswil
  Operates non stop between Stadelhofen and Meilen, Winterthur and Effretikon, stops in Kemptthal as of 9:20 PM.
- S8 Winterthur–Wallisellen–Oerlikon–Zürich HB–Thalwil–Freienbach SBB-Pfäffikon SZ (–Ziegelbrücke)
  Operates non stop between Winterthur and Effretikon; first and last services extended to Ziegelbrücke.
- S9 (Schaffhausen–) Rafz–Hardbrücke–Zürich HB–Uster
  Operates every 30 minutes between Schaffhausen and Rafz only during rush hour, otherwise every hours.
- S11 Aarau–Lenzburg–Dietikon–Zürich HB–Zürich Stettbach–Winterthur–Seuzach/Sennhof-Kyburg (–Wila)
  Operates non stop between Stettbach and Winterthur; the lines to Seuzach and Sennhof-Kyburg are operated alternately at hourly intervals; supplementary trains to Wila.
- S12 Brugg AG–Zürich HB–Zürich Stettbach– Winterthur–Schaffhausen/Wil SG
  Operates non stop between Stettbach and Winterthur; the lines to Schaffhausen and Wil SG are operated alternately at hourly intervals.
- S14 Affoltern am Albis–Zürich HB–Oerlikon–Uster–Wetzikon–Hinwil
  Operates non stop between Zürich Altstetten and Zürich HB.
- S15 Niederweningen–Hardbrücke–Zürich HB–Uster–Wetzikon–Rapperswil
  Stops between Stadelhofen and Wetzikon only in Uster.
- S16 Zürich Flughafen –Hardbrücke–Zürich HB–Herrliberg-Feldmeilen (–Meilen)
  Extended in the evening to Meilen.
- S19 (Koblenz–Baden–) Dietikon–Zürich HB–Oerlikon–Effretikon (–Pfäffikon ZH )
- S20 Uerikon–Zürich HB–Hardbrücke
  Operates only during rush hour; stops between Männedorf and Stadelhofen only in Meilen and Küsnacht ZH.
- S21 Regensdorf-Watt–Hardbrücke–Zürich HB
  Operates only during rush hour; non-stop between Oerlikon and Regensdorf-Watt; morning services to Zürich HB and evening services to Regensdorf-Wall also stop in Zürich Affoltern.
- S23 Zürich HB–Zürich Stadelhofen–Winterthur–Frauenfeld–Romanshorn
  Operates only during rush hour; morning services to Zürich and evening services to Romanshorn; stops between Stadelhofen and Amriswil only in Winterthur, Frauenfeld, Weinfelden and Sulgen.
- S24 Thayngen/Weinfelden–Winterthur–Zürich Flughafen –Wipkingen–Zürich HB–Thalwil–Zug
  Services stop in Kemptthal until 9:20 PM; the lines to Thayngen and Weinfelden are operated alternately at hourly intervals; stops between Neuhausen and Winterthur only in Andelfingen.
- S25 Zürich HB–Pfäffikon SZ–Ziegelbrücke–Glarus–Linthal
  Operates non stop between Zürich HB and Wädenswil.
- S42 Zürich HB–Othmarsingen–Muri AG
  Operates only during rush hour; stops between Mägenwil and Zürich HB only in Dietikon and Altstetten. Serves Mägenwil only in the direction of Muri AG and Othmarsingen only in the direction of Zürich HB.

During weekends, there are eight nighttime S-Bahn services (SN1, SN4, SN5, SN6, SN7, SN8, SN9, SN11) calling at the Hauptbahnhof, offered by ZVV:

- SN1: hourly service between Aarau and Winterthur.
- SN4: hourly service to Langnau-Gattikon.
- SN5: hourly service between Knonau and Pfäffikon SZ.
- SN6: hourly service between Würenlos and Winterthur.
- SN7: hourly service between Bassersdorf and Stäfa.
- SN8: hourly service between Lachen and Pfäffikon ZH.
- SN9: hourly service between Bülach and Uster.
- SN11: hourly service between Winterthur and Olten.

=== Urban public transport ===
Around the station, the trams and trolleybuses of the Verkehrsbetriebe Zürich (VBZ) provide local public transport services. The Hauptbahnhof (HB) is one of the most important nodes of the Zurich tramway network.

As of the December 2025 timetable change, the five tram and bus stops around the main station are served by the following lines:

- Sihlquai/HB to the north next to exit Sihlquai via the most western underpass, tram lines 17, 50, and 51;
- Bahnhofquai/HB to the east via the main hall, or underground ShopVille, trolleybus 46 (tram stop is refurbished from 14 December 2025 to 12 December 2026 and therefore closed);
- Bahnhofplatz/HB to the south via traverse hall, main hall, or underground ShopVille, tram lines 3, 6, 10, 14 and trolleybus 31;
- Bahnhofstrasse/HB just south of Bahnhofplatz via main hall or underground ShopVille, tram lines 4, 7, 11, 13 and 15;
- Sihlpost/HB 300 m (980 ft) to the south-west from exit Europaallee via the most western underpass, tram lines 3, 14 and trolleybus 31.

Two additional tram/bus stops, Central and Löwenplatz, are within walking distance. Near the entrance of Platzspitz park, next to the Swiss National Museum, northeast of HB, there is a pier for the Limmat cruise boats.

=== Train operations ===
Due to its central location in Switzerland and in Europe, the station was quickly able to establish itself as an important railway junction. Most trains running through several European countries operated through Switzerland. In addition, a majority of Swiss mainline trains travelled to or from Zurich. For the clock-face timetable introduced to Switzerland in 1982, Zurich is the "pacemaker". Delays and other disruptions at Zürich Hauptbahnhof sometimes affect the whole of Switzerland.

Long-distance trains meet in Zurich on the hour and half-hour, and thus connect with each other. In cases of delays, connecting trains wait a maximum of 3 minutes beyond the scheduled departure time, except for some international trains and the late night trains. S-Bahn services do not wait for late connecting trains, but the long-distance trains – contrary to popular opinion – usually wait for delayed S-Bahn trains (also for a maximum of 3 minutes).

=== Taxi stands ===
Taxi stands are located on Bahnhofplatz, Postbrücke and along Museumstrasse along the northern side of the station building. An additional taxi stand is situated at Central.

=== Customs ===
Zurich main station is, for customs purposes, a border station for passengers arriving from Germany. As such, customs checks may be performed in the station by Swiss customs officials. Systematic passport controls were abolished, however, when Switzerland joined the Schengen Area in 2008.

== Flood risk ==
The Sihl (and the Schanzengraben outflow from Lake Zurich) passes through the station in a tunnel, with platforms above and below the river, and public circulation areas to either side. The tunnel comprises 5 culverts with a length of 190 metres (623 ft) and a clear opening of 12 metres (39 ft) by 3 metres (10 ft) each. This limits the river's flow capacity, raising concerns about the capacity of the tunnel to deal with extreme flood events. Additionally, during the building of the new Löwenstrasse platforms, it was necessary to temporarily close part of this tunnel, thus reducing the capacity even further.

Some 50 kilometres (31 mi) upstream of the station lies the Sihlsee, Switzerland's largest artificial lake, which is impounded by a 33-metre (108 ft) high dam. Studies showed that a failure of this dam could lead to an 8-metre (26 ft) high flood wave reaching the Hauptbahnhof within 2 hours. This threat has led the City of Zurich to develop, publish and test evacuation plans for the affected areas of the city, and especially the station area.

== See also ==
- History of rail transport in Switzerland
- Rail transport in Switzerland
- Public transport in Zurich
