= Platzspitz park =

Park in Zürich, Switzerland

Coordinates: 47°22′51″N 8°32′23″E

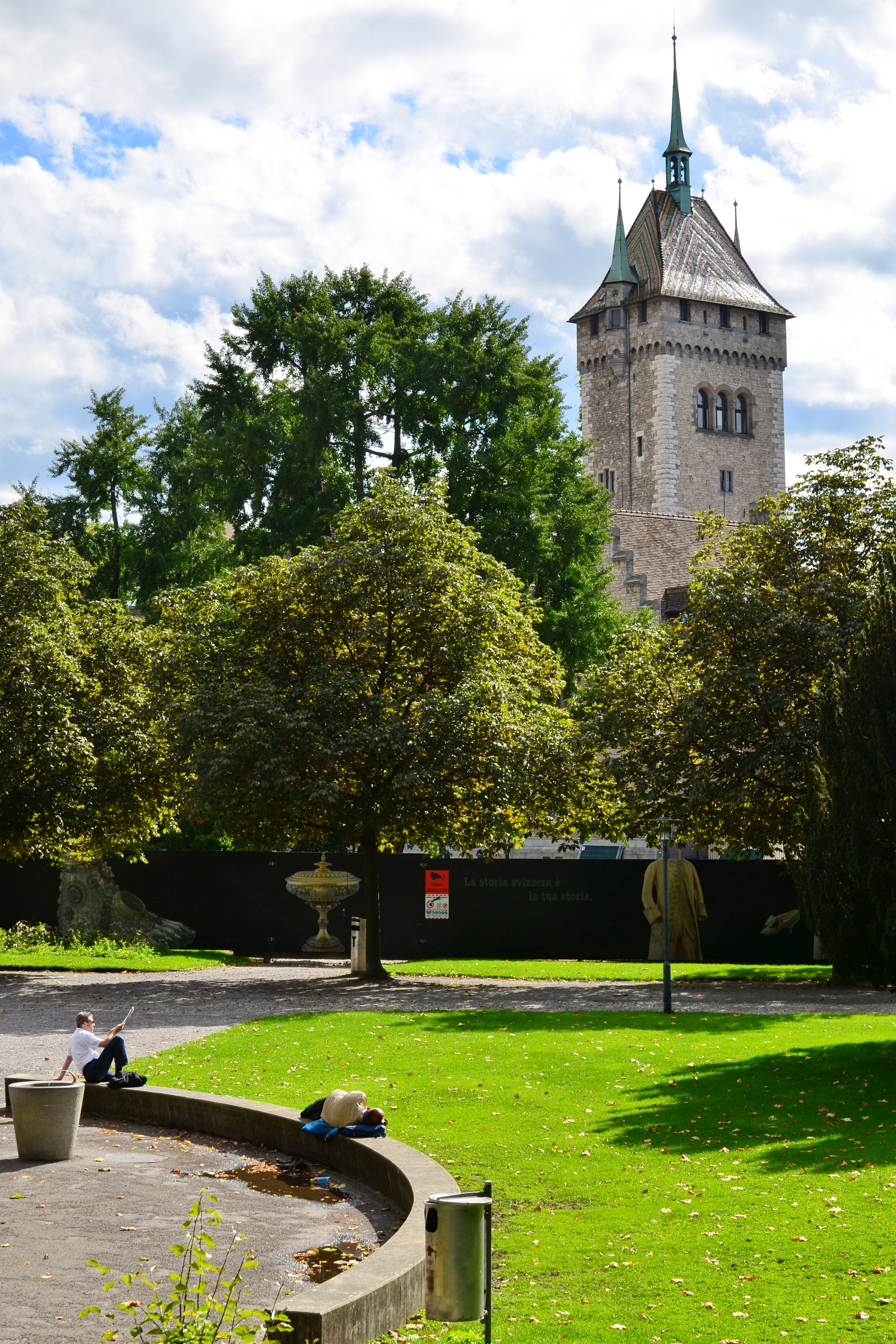
A view of the Platzspitz Park

Platzspitz, officially Platzpromenade, is a park in District 1 of the city of Zurich, Switzerland. It is located next to the Swiss National Museum (Landesmuseum) and Central Station and bound by the rivers Sihl to the west and Limmat to the east. The confluence of these rivers lies just north of the park.

Several tall Platanus trees grow in the park, which are some of Zurich's oldest trees. The park also features a statue of the Swiss poet Salomon Gessner and a gazebo. At Platzspitz's northern end, two bridges link the park with the neighbouring quarters and the Dynamo youth center. The park shares a landing stage with the Landesmuseum, served by the ZSG Limmat river cruise.

== History ==
The history of the park goes back to the Middle Ages. It was originally used as a hunting and shooting ground in the 14th century, and by the end of the 18th century, the park was also adorned with beautiful Baroque architecture.

During the 1980s, heroin users would frequently gather at the park, and attempts to disperse them merely resulted in them regrouping elsewhere. Thus, in 1987, the authorities chose to allow illegal drug use and sales at the park in an effort to contain Zürich's growing drug problem. Police were not allowed to enter the park or make arrests. The Zurich Intervention Pilot Project, or ZIPP-AIDS program, responded to 6,700 episodes of overdose in the park, vaccinated thousands of persons for hepatitis B, and furnished about 10 million sterile syringes at the site, as well as millions of alcohol pads, condoms, and sachets of ointment for injection sites on the skin. However, a lack of control over what went on in the park caused a multitude of problems. Drug dealers and users arrived from all over Europe, and crime became rampant as dealers fought for control and addicts, numbering up to 1,000, stole to support their habit. The once-beautiful gardens had degraded into a mess of mud and used needles, and the emergency services were overwhelmed by the number of overdoses, which took place almost nightly. Platzspitz, or Needle Park as it was then known, became a source of embarrassment to the Zurich municipal council and in 1992, police moved in to clear up the park. The drug scene was then moved to the adjacent area of Letten railway station, which closed services in 1989. This spot was also cleared by police in 1995.

Platzspitz has been cleaned up and restored, and today it is presented by the authorities as a peaceful, family-friendly garden.

== National Exhibition Vestige ==
One structure that stands out is the gazebo that stands just behind the Swiss National Museum. It is very close to Zürich's main railway station. The Gazebo is a vestige of Switzerland's first National Exhibition of 1883. It was first built to be a musical pavilion, a function it still serves to this day.

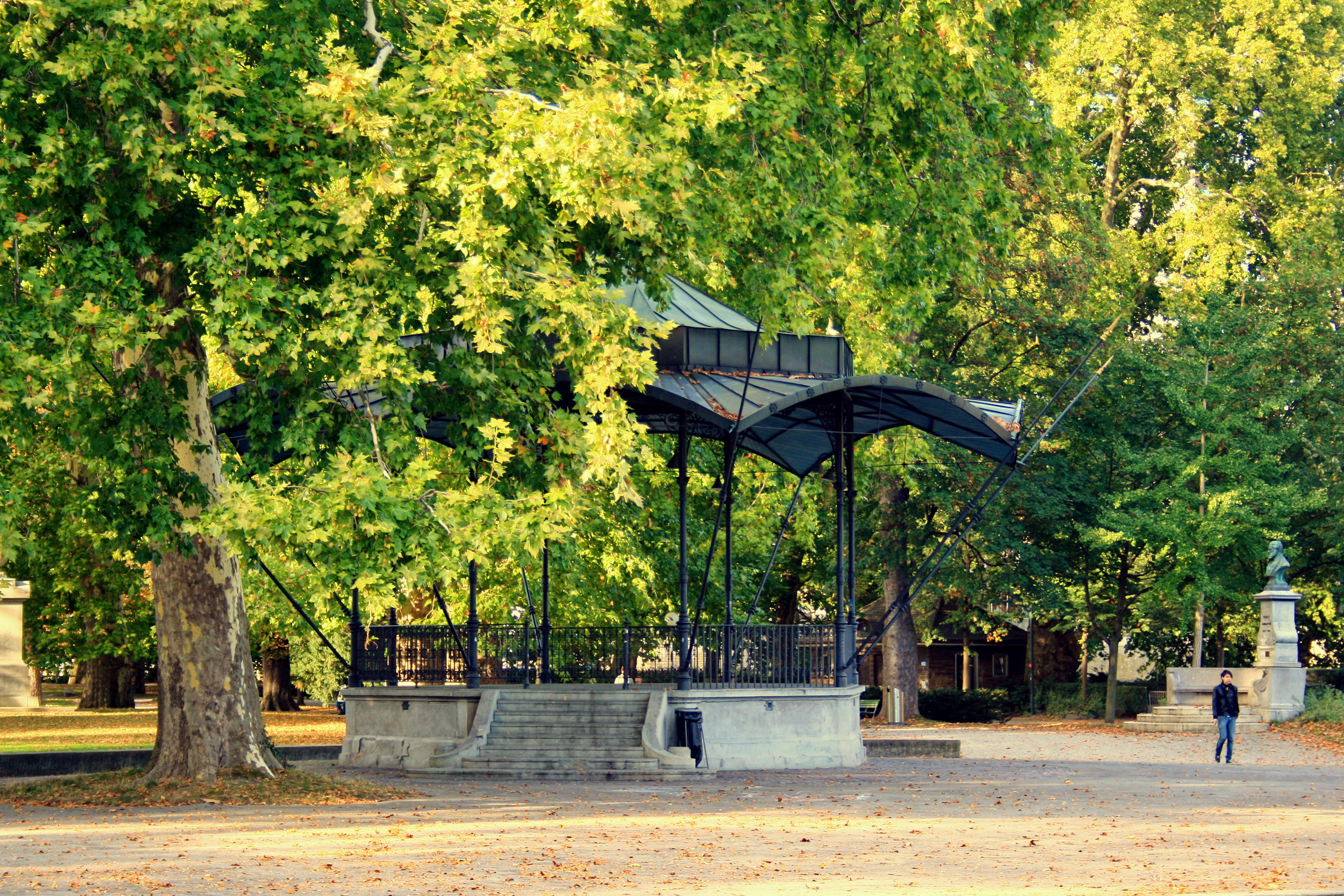
The gazebo in the Platzspitz Park
