= ShopVille =

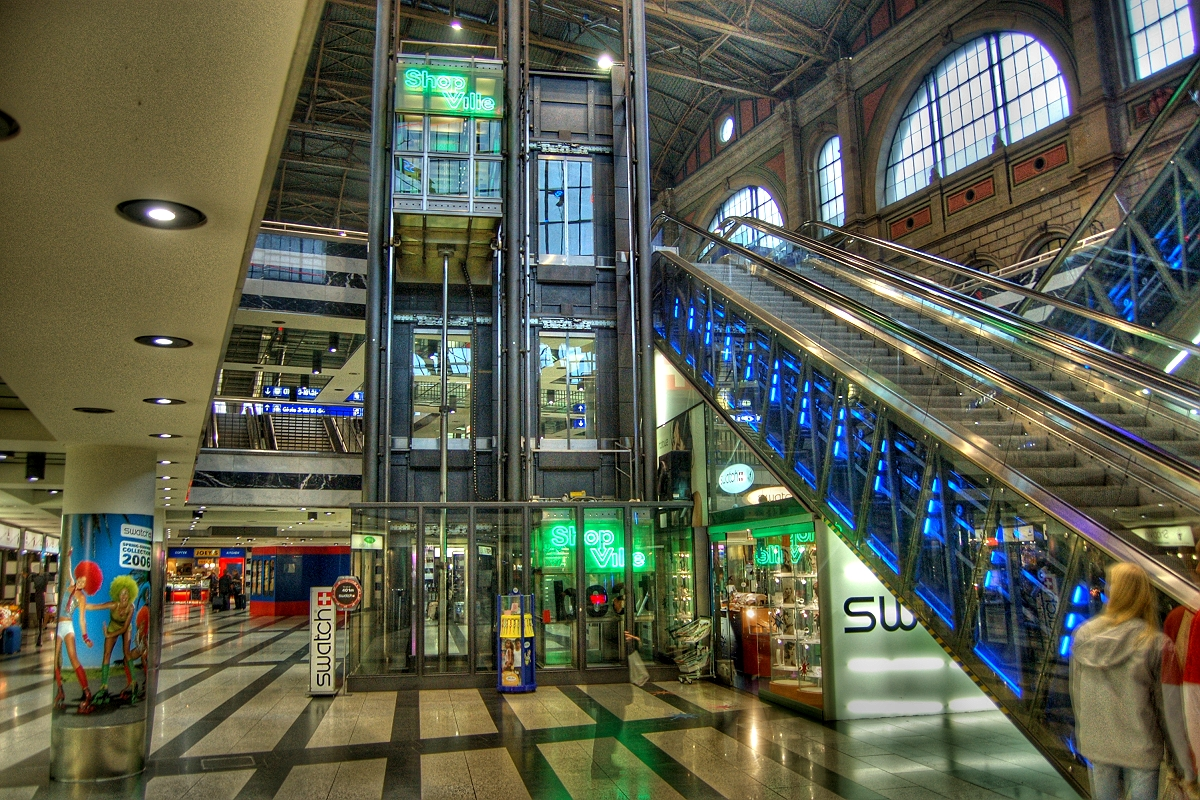
- Pictured in 2006
- Location: Zürich Hauptbahnhof, Switzerland
- Coordinates: 47°22′35″N 8°32′23″E
- Address: Museumstrasse 1, 8021
- Opened: October 1, 1970 (56 years ago)
- Owner: Swiss Federal Railways (SBB); City of Zurich
- Num. of stores: approx. 190 (as of 2025)
- Parking: none
- Website: SBB website

ShopVille is a subterranean shopping arcade in the city of Zurich, Switzerland. Opened in 1970, it is located beneath Bahnhofplatz and the adjacent main railway station (Zürich Hauptbahnhof/HB), and above the subterranean railway stations of Zürich HB SZU, Löwenstrasse and Museumstrasse. It is jointly owned by Swiss Federal Railways (SBB) and the City of Zurich.

== Facilities ==
ShopVille includes around 190 shops, restaurants, services and a non-denominational church. The floor area was extended with the construction of the Löwenstrasse subterranean railway station, which opened in 2014.

The development is connected to the surface level and undergraound railway stations by stairs, escalators and elevators. Direct access exists, among others, to Bahnhofstrasse, Bahnhofplatz, Bahnhofquai, Museumstrasse, Swiss National Museum, and the main hall in the railway station building.

The fountain, which comprises part of the statue of Alfred Escher in Bahnhofplatz, connects to ShopVille's Züri Fountain, 4.7 metres (15 ft) below ground.

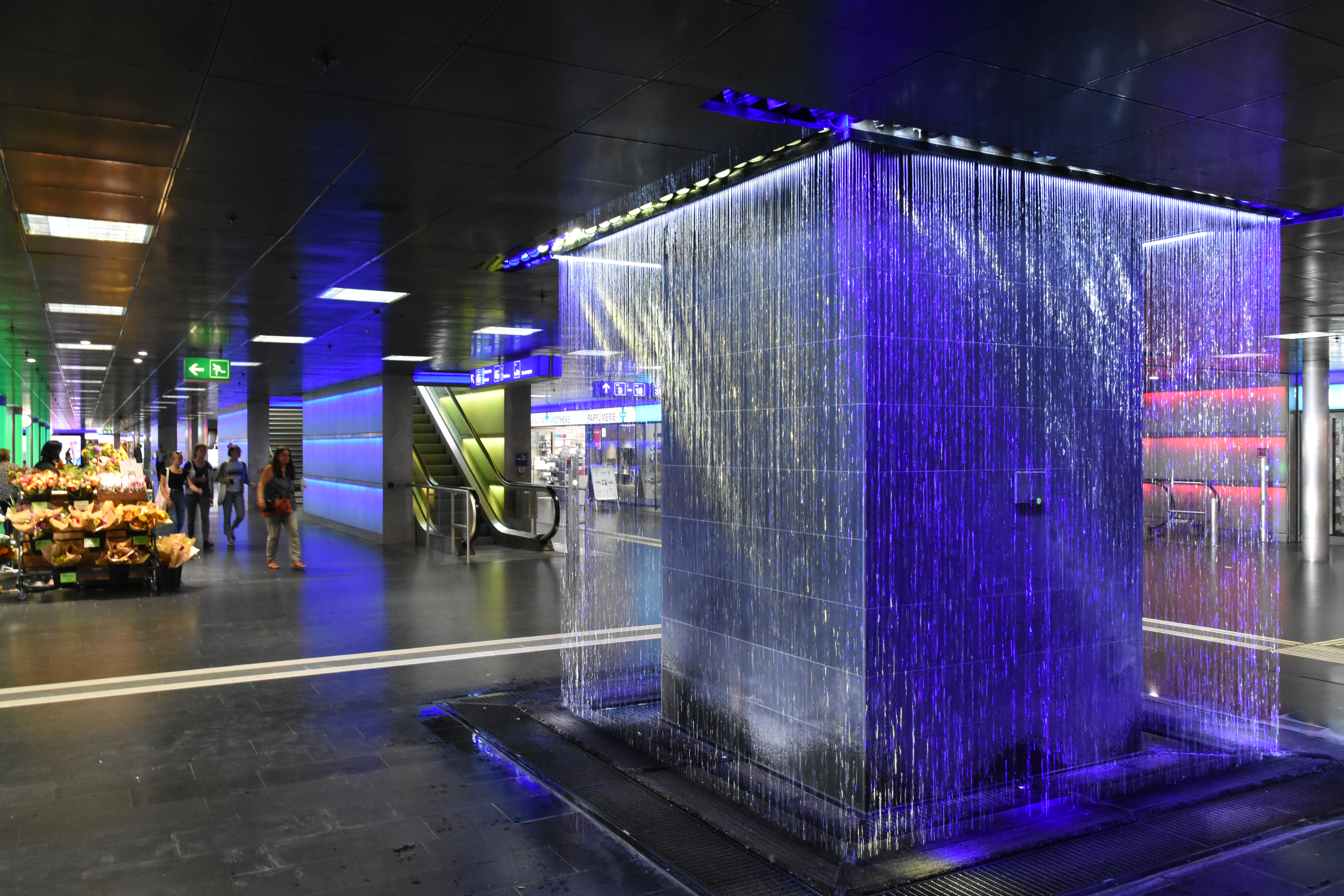
Züri Fountain below Bahnhofplatz

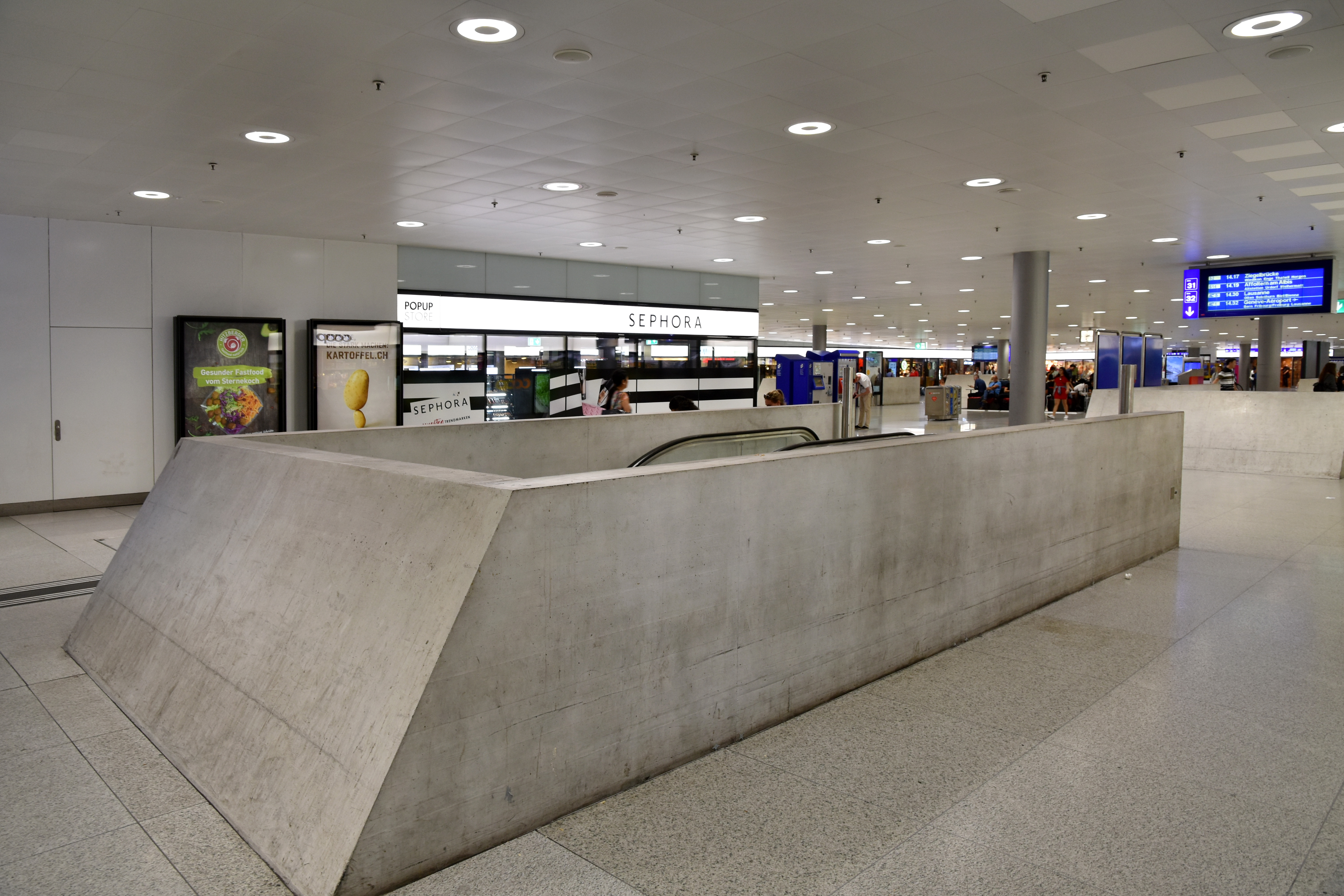
ShopVille above Löwenstrasse station

== Incidents ==
On 19 November, 1979, four armed guerillas robbed the city's Swiss People's Bank and escaped to the main railway station on bicycles. A gunfight ensued in ShopVille, killing a bystander and wounding two police officers and another bystander.

== See also ==
- Europaallee
- Glattzentrum
- Sihlcity
