= Richard Kissling =

Swiss artist (1848–1919)

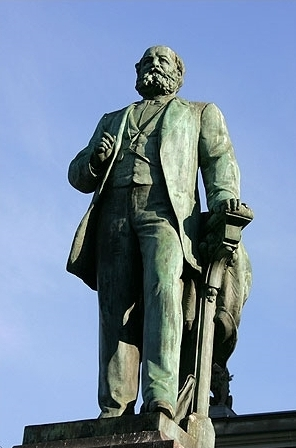
Alfred Escher Memorial, Zurich

Richard Kissling (15 April 1848 – 19 July 1919) was a Swiss sculptor and medallist.

== Biography ==
Born in Wolfwil, Switzerland, Kissling went through apprenticeship as a plasterer before moving to Rome for 13 years, studying under the sculptor Ferdinand Schlöth. At the 1883 National Exhibition in Zurich, Kissling showed a portrait bust of the Swiss politician Alfred Escher. As a result, he was given the 1889 commission for Escher's statue in bronze and granite, in front of the Arch at Zürich Hauptbahnhof.

Kissling became one of the most widely employed Swiss sculptors for monuments and memorials, although his heroic classical style was increasingly regarded as outdated towards the end of his career.

His other works include:

- The William Tell Monument in Altdorf, the result of an 1892 national competition and probably Kissling's best-known work. It was inaugurated on 28 August 1895.
- Jünglingsfigur, Villa Tobler in Zürich,
- statue of Joachim Vadian in St. Gallen, 1904,
- Rizal Monument in Rizal Park, Manila, 1912. A national monument, erected on the park where the Philippine national hero was executed.

== Selected works ==
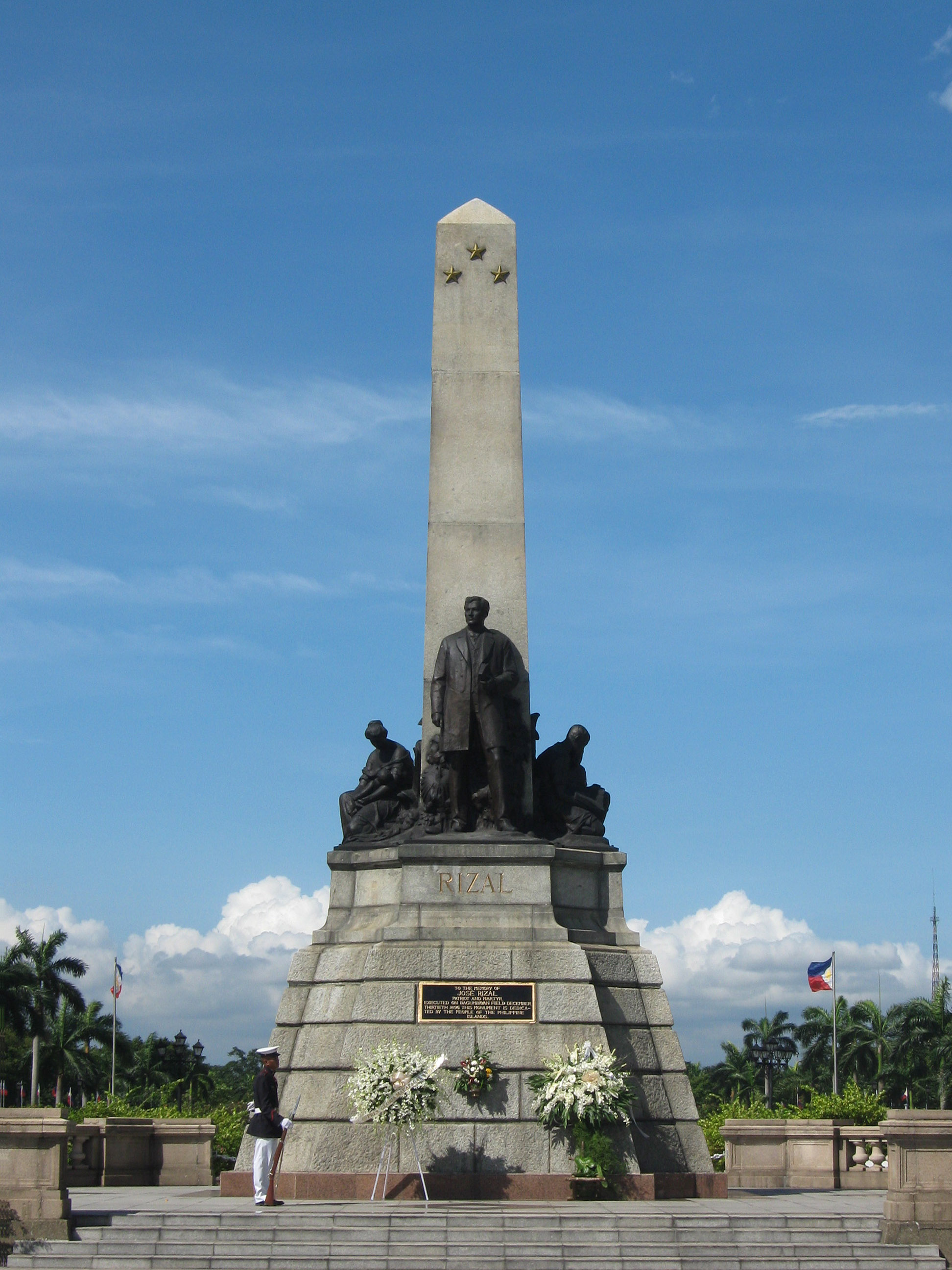
Rizal Monument, Manila

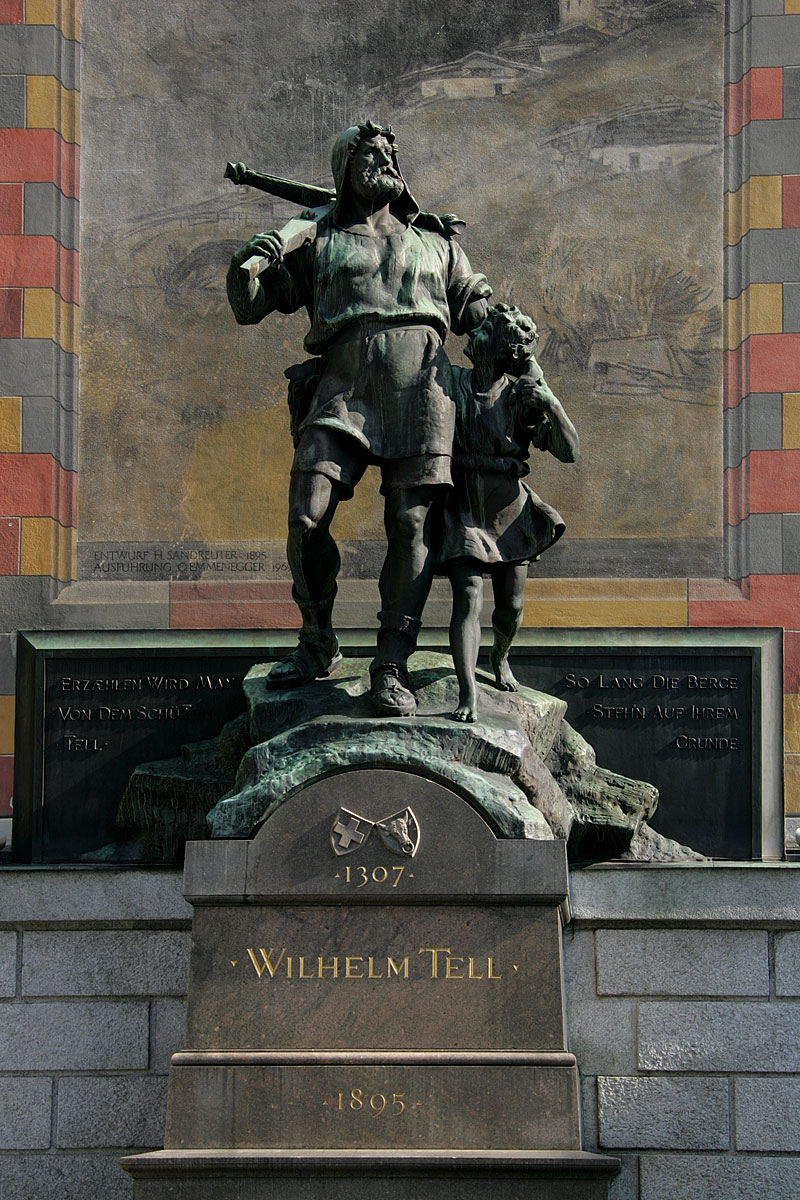
William Tell Monument, Altdorf

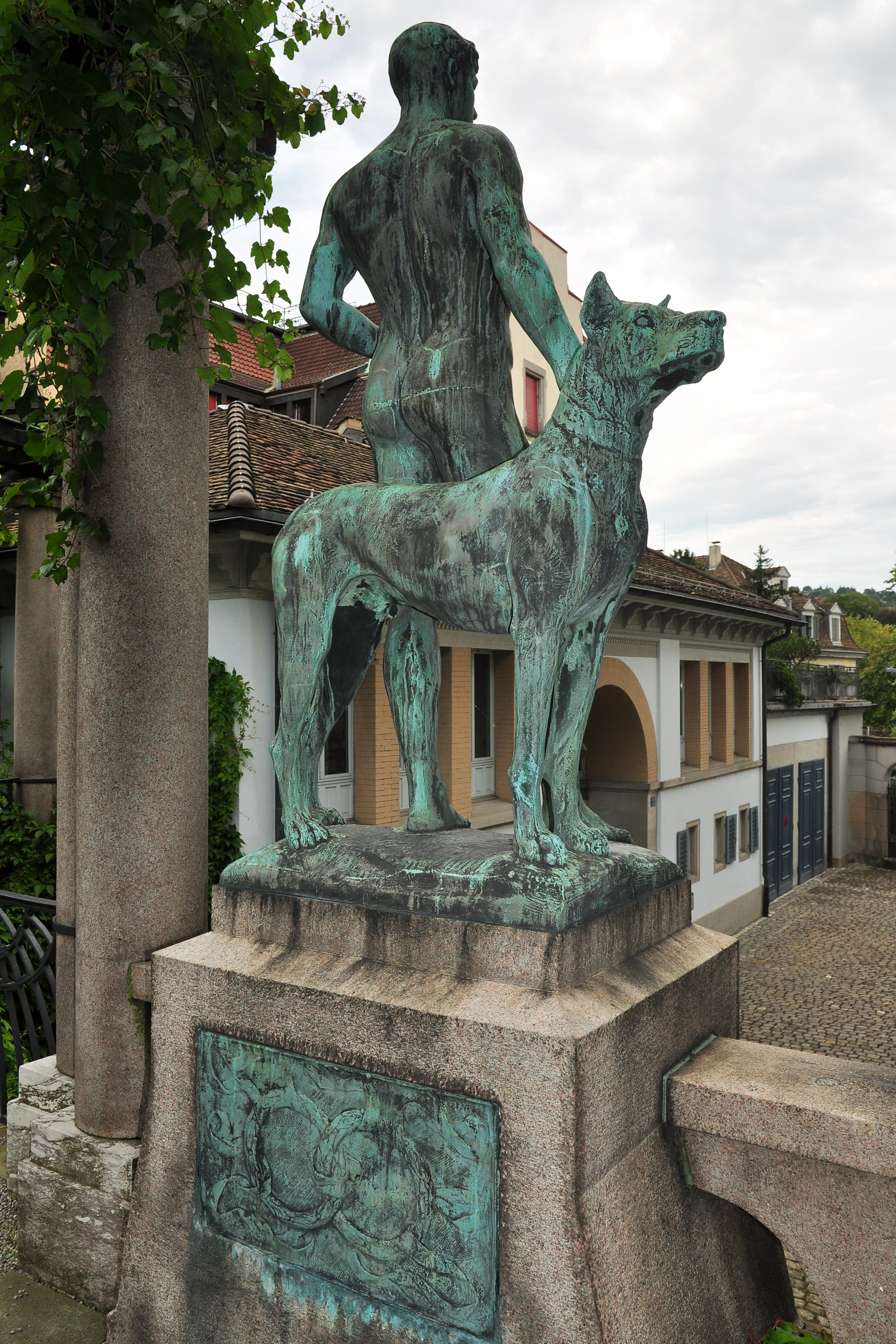
Jünglingsfigur, Villa Tobler in Zürich

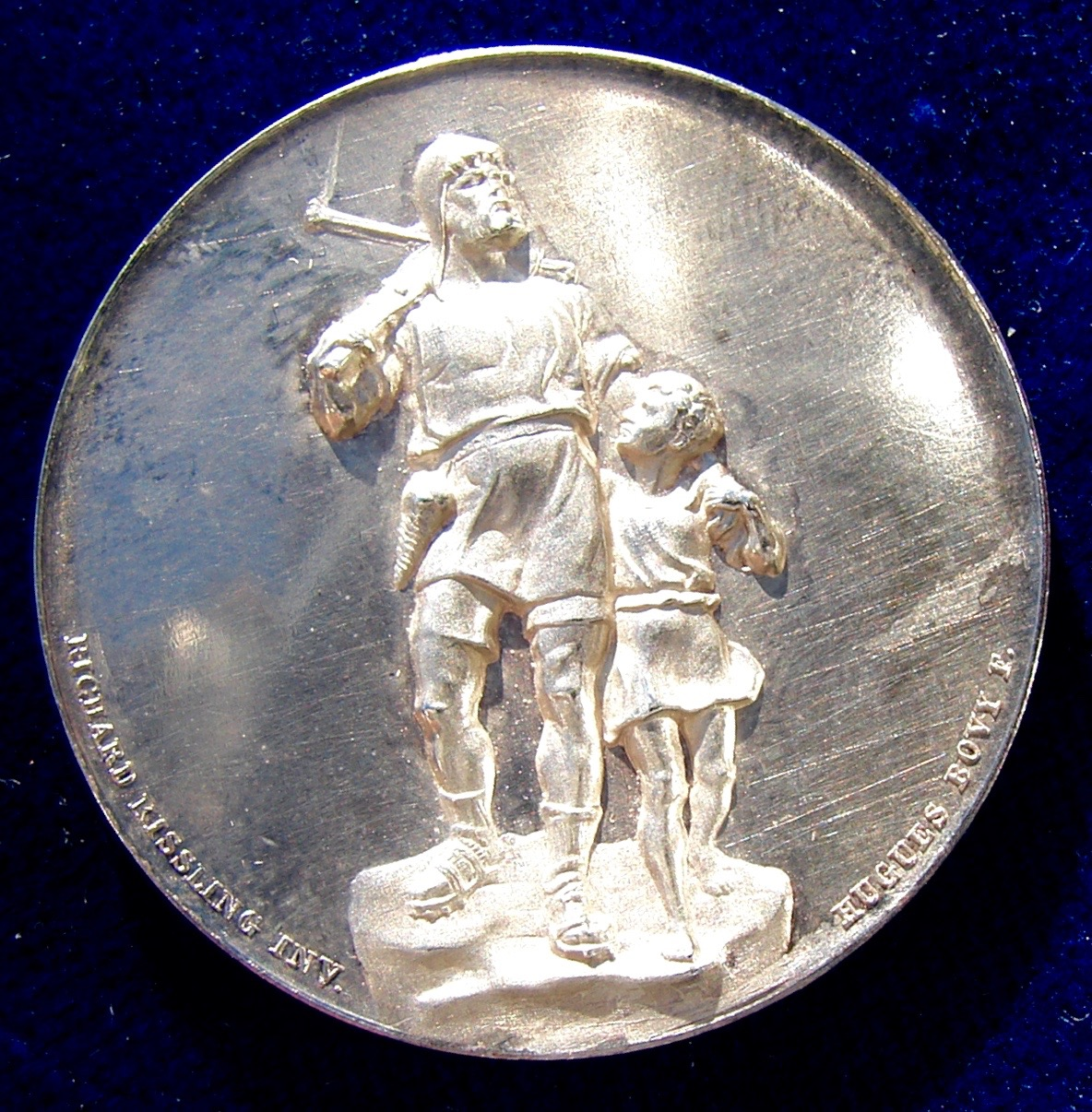
Zürich 1893 Cantonal Shooting Festival Silver Medal, obverse. It shows the design of Kissling's William Tell Monument in Altdorf.

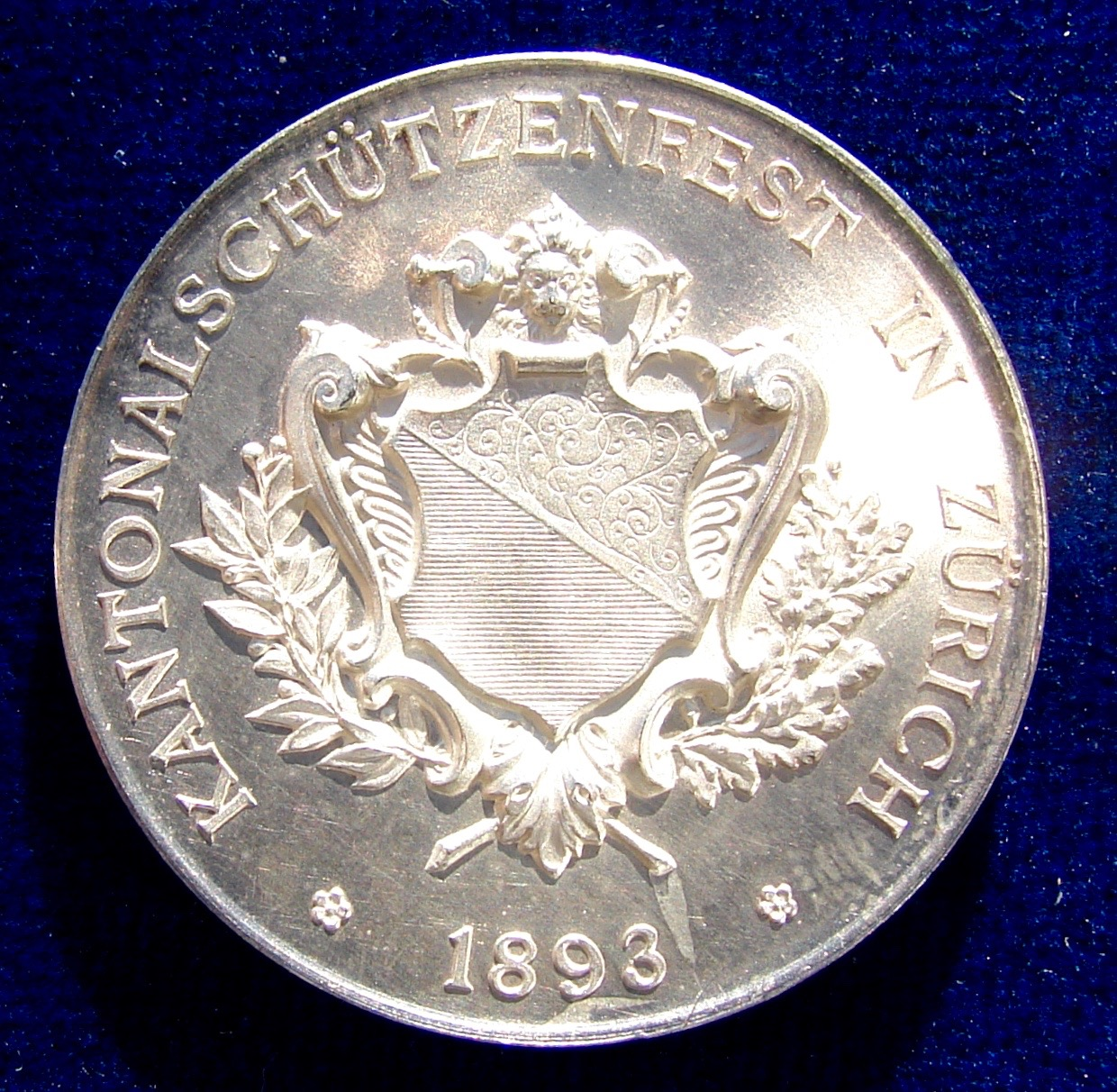
Kissling's Zürich 1893 Cantonal Shooting Festival Silver Medal, reverse
