= Juno Fountain, Zurich =

Fountain in Zurich, Switzerland

Juno Fountain
- Junobrunnen (German)
- Pictured in 2009, looking north
- Year: 19th century
- Type: Public fountain
- Medium: Stone
- Location: Bahnhofstrasse, Zurich, Switzerland; 47.37010°N 8.53939°E

The Juno Fountain (German: Junobrunnen) is a fountain on Bahnhofstrasse, near Paradeplatz, in Zurich, Switzerland. It stands near the southern elevation of Peterhof, which was built in 1913. Constructed in the 19th century, it is one of around 1,200 public fountains in the city. In 1872, the circular basin replaced the original rectangular trough.

== See also ==
- Fountains of Zurich
