= Beyer Watches & Jewellery =

Swiss watch and jewelry maker

Coordinates: 47.3708862°N 8.5386424°E

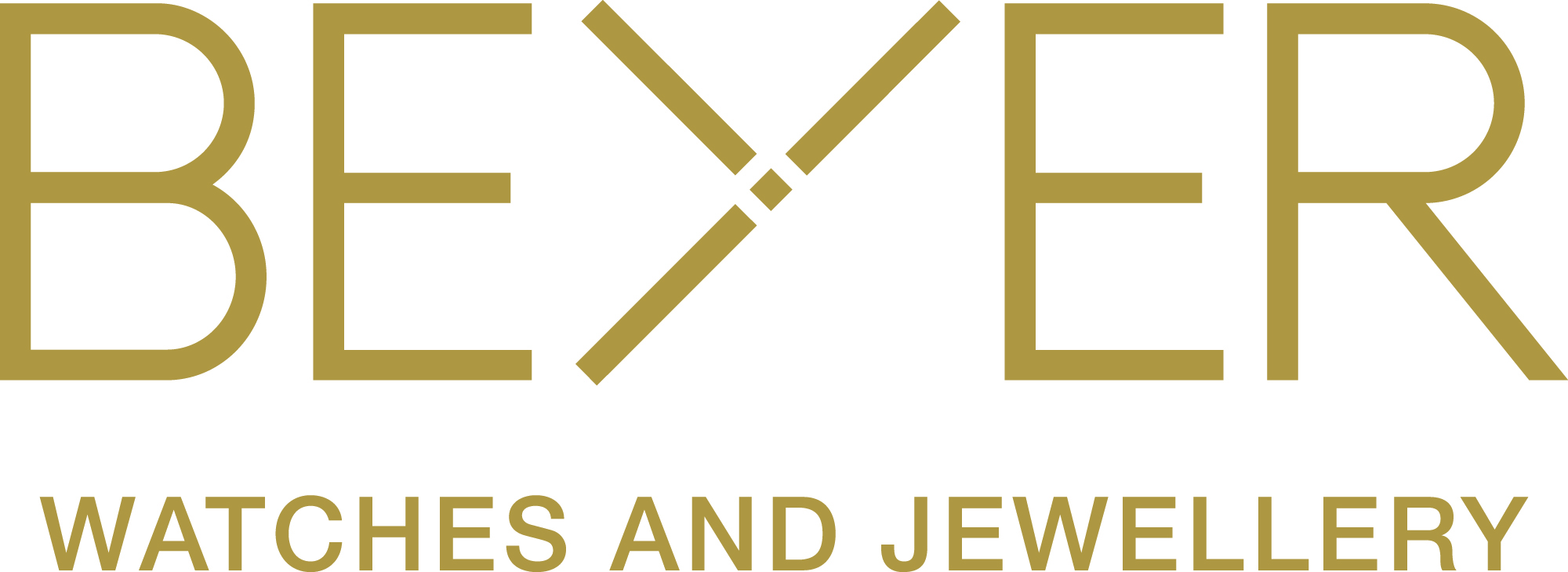

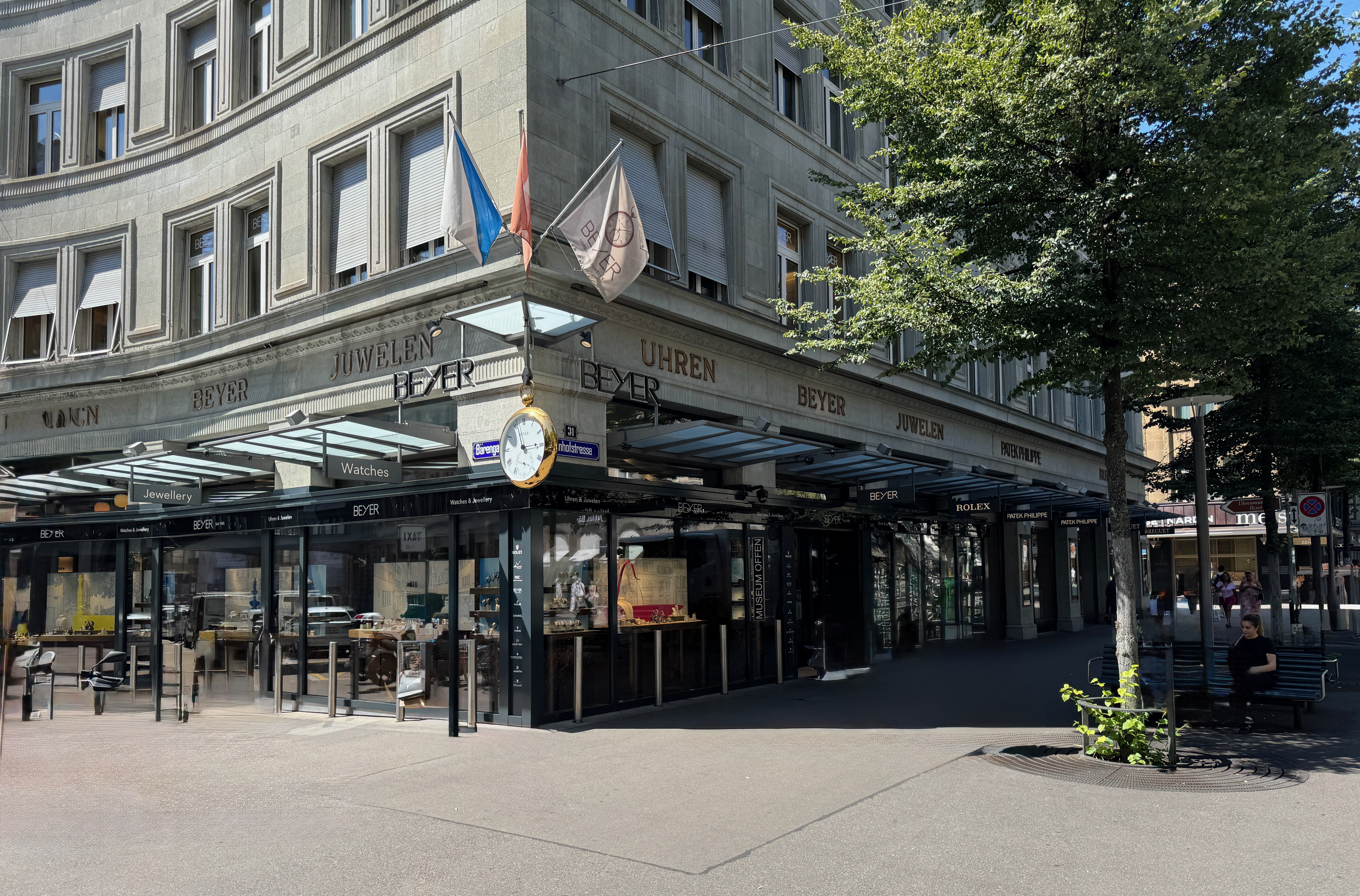
- The business in 2024
- Type: Family-owned business
- Founded: 1760 (266 years ago)
- Headquarters: Bahnhofstrasse, Zürich, Switzerland
- Key people: Muriel Zahn Beyer (CEO)
- Number of employees: 62
- Website: https://www.beyer-ch.com/en

Beyer Watches & Jewellery (German: Beyer Uhren & Juwelen) is a watch and jewellery maker and retailer in Zürich, Switzerland. Located on Bahnhofstrasse, at its junction with Bärengasse, the business was established in 1760, making it the oldest watch retailer in the world. It is owned by Muriel Zahn-Beyer, member of the eighth generation of the Beyer family. The business will cease operations at the end of 2026.

== History ==
Matthäus Beyer founded the company in 1760 in the German town of Donaueschingen, Baden-Württemberg. His grandson, Stephan, moved the business to Feuerthalen, Switzerland, in 1822. It was a watchmaker's and spice shop at that time. Stephan's son, Theodor Beyer-Danioth, opened a shop in Niederdorf, Zurich, in 1860. It moved to Paradeplatz (in the building today occupied by Credit Suisse) in 1877. Shortly thereafter, Adelrich Beyer took over the management of the company. It relocated again, in 1927, to its current location in the Orell Füssli building at Bahnhofstrasse 31.

In 1948, the business converted into a company, Beyer Chronometrie AG, limited by shares. The shares are owned by the family. Theodor R. Beyer became the owner in 1955, taking over from his father, also named Theodor. Theodor R. Beyer stepped back from running family business after a heart attack in 1986. His son, René, essentially led the family business and had formally taken over as a managing director a decade later. René Beyer died in 2025, aged 61. The business is now headed by Muriel Zahn Beyer, René's sister.

Beyer's own watches are manufactured by Aerowatch in Saignelégier, Switzerland. In 2003, the company opened a goldsmith's atelier.

== Brands ==
The company represented Patek Philippe since 1842, IWC since 1893, Rolex and Jaeger-LeCoultre since 1932, as well as Breguet, Breitling, Tudor, Hublot, and many others. In the 1960s, the company pioneered the second-hand market of luxury watches. In 2023, it began selling certified pre-owned Rolex watches.

== Museum ==
The business opened a museum, the Uhrenmuseum Beyer, in the same building in 1971. It was originally called the Museum of Timekeeping. The museum houses one of the most notable private collection of up to 300 timepieces from 1,400 BC to the present day.

== Publications ==
- Edmond Saran (January 28, 2016). "Interview. Beyer: The oldest watch retailer in the world". Le Monde Edmond. Archived from the original on March 25, 2016.
