= Statue of Alfred Escher =

Statue of Swiss businessman

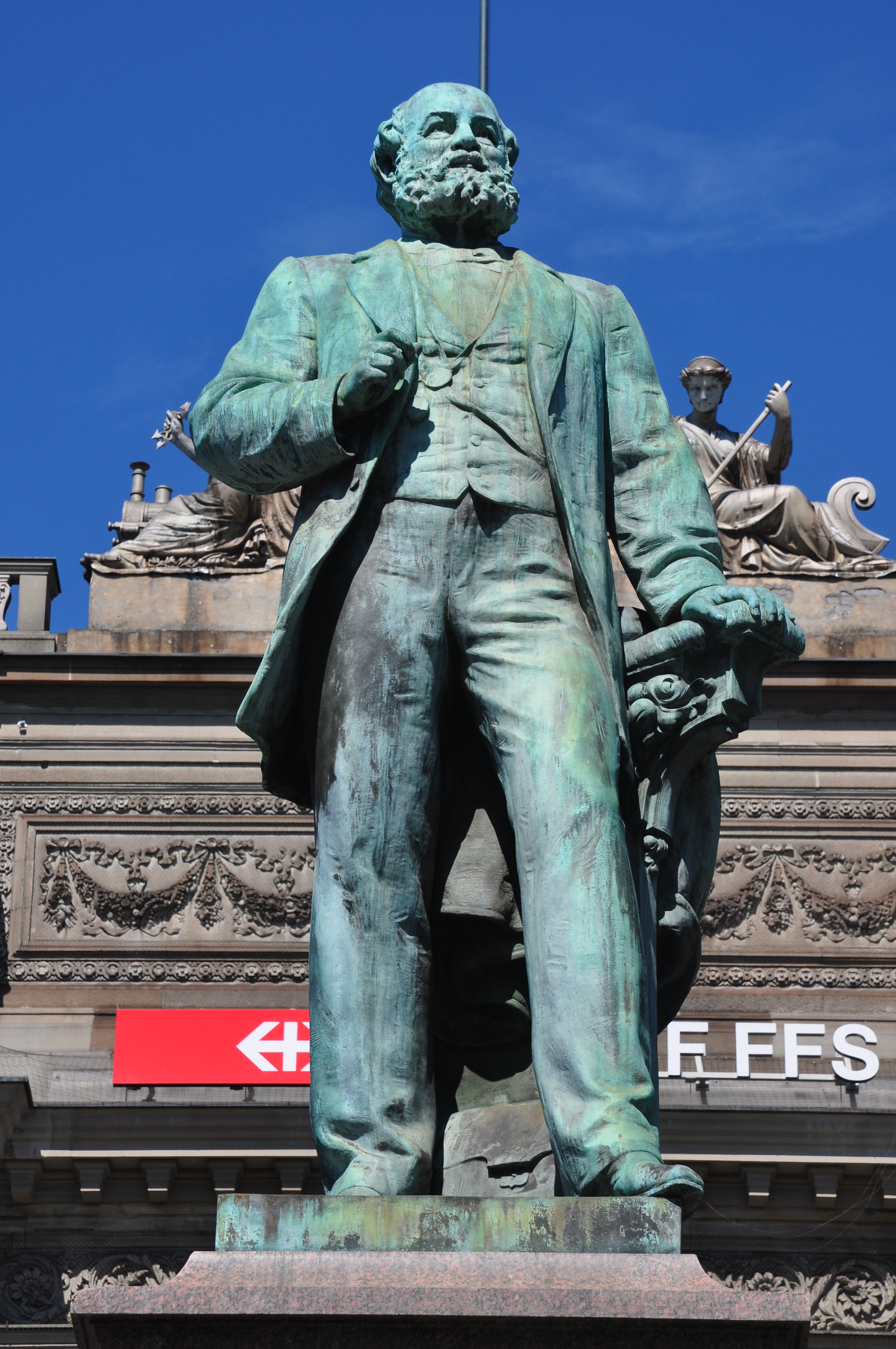
- The statue standing atop the memorial
- Interactive map of Statue of Alfred Escher
- Location: Bahnhofplatz, Zurich, Switzerland
- Coordinates: 47.37713°N 8.53996°E
- Designer: Richard Kissling
- Type: Statue
- Material: Bronze (statue) and granite (base)
- Opening date: 1889 (137 years ago)
- Dedicated to: Alfred Escher

The Statue of Alfred Escher is located in the city centre of Zurich, Switzerland. It stands in Bahnhofplatz, in front of the southern entrance of the main building of Central Station (Hauptbahnhof or HB, completed in 1871) and at the northern end of Bahnhofstrasse, the city's shopping avenue. The statue, which is made of bronze, was designed by Richard Kissling (1848–1919) and was erected in 1889. Alfred Escher (1819–1882) was a Zurich-born business magnate, banker, railway pioneer and politician.

The statue stands atop a granite memorial fountain with a small garden on its eastern side and two tram stops of the Zürcher Verkehrsverbund transport network on its western side. The water from the statue's base forms an additional fountain in the underground level below the square, now a shopping centre named ShopVille.

== History ==
In February 1883, a committee was formed for the purpose of erecting a memorial statue to Alfred Escher. The commission went to the sculptor Richard Kissling. The Alfred Escher memorial was erected outside Zurich Central Station and was inaugurated on 22 June 1889. About the memorial's granite base are figures representing progress and industry, while a bronze child holds a wreath of immortality.

== Images ==
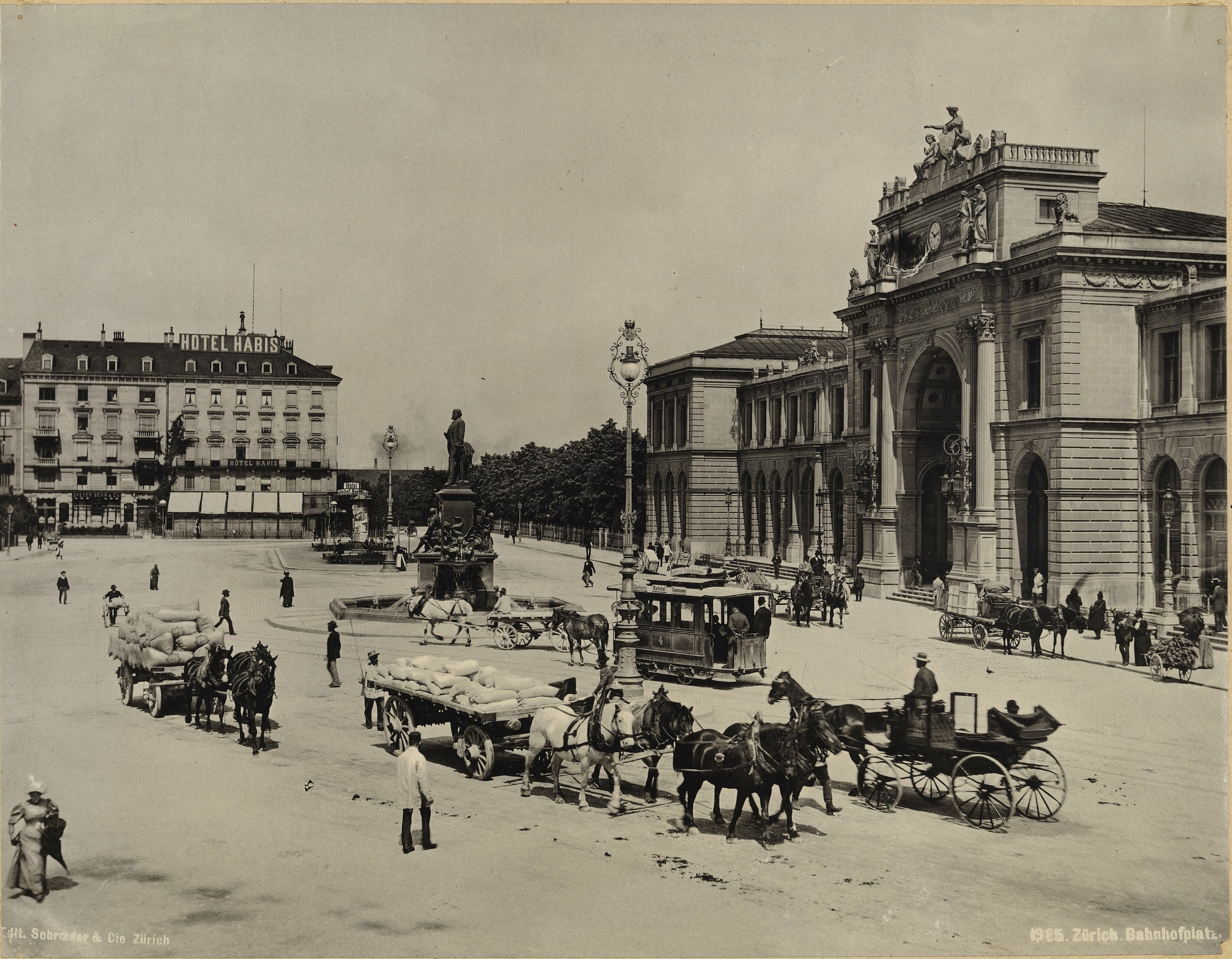
Bahnhofplatz pictured in 1902, looking west

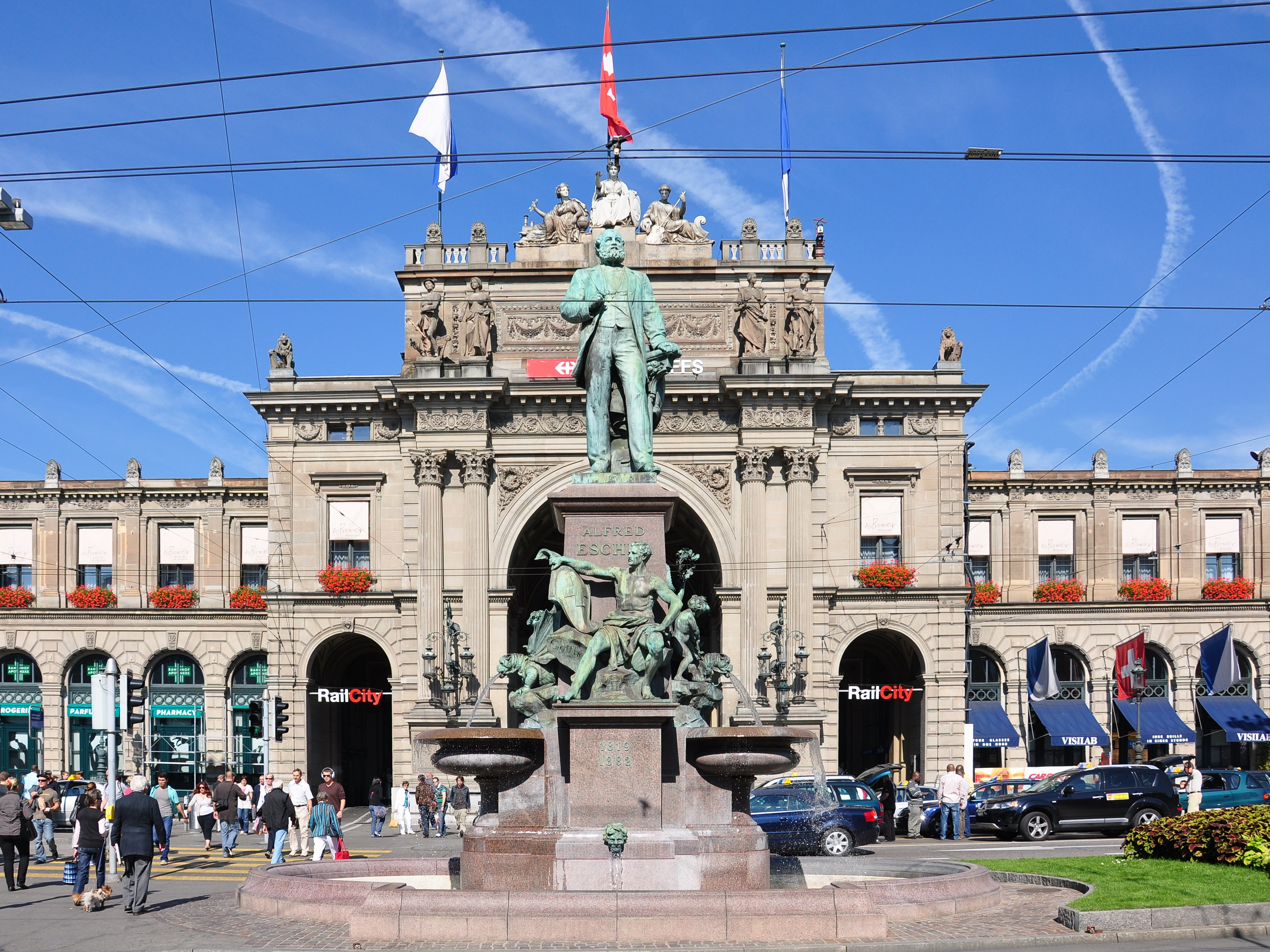
Statue and memorial

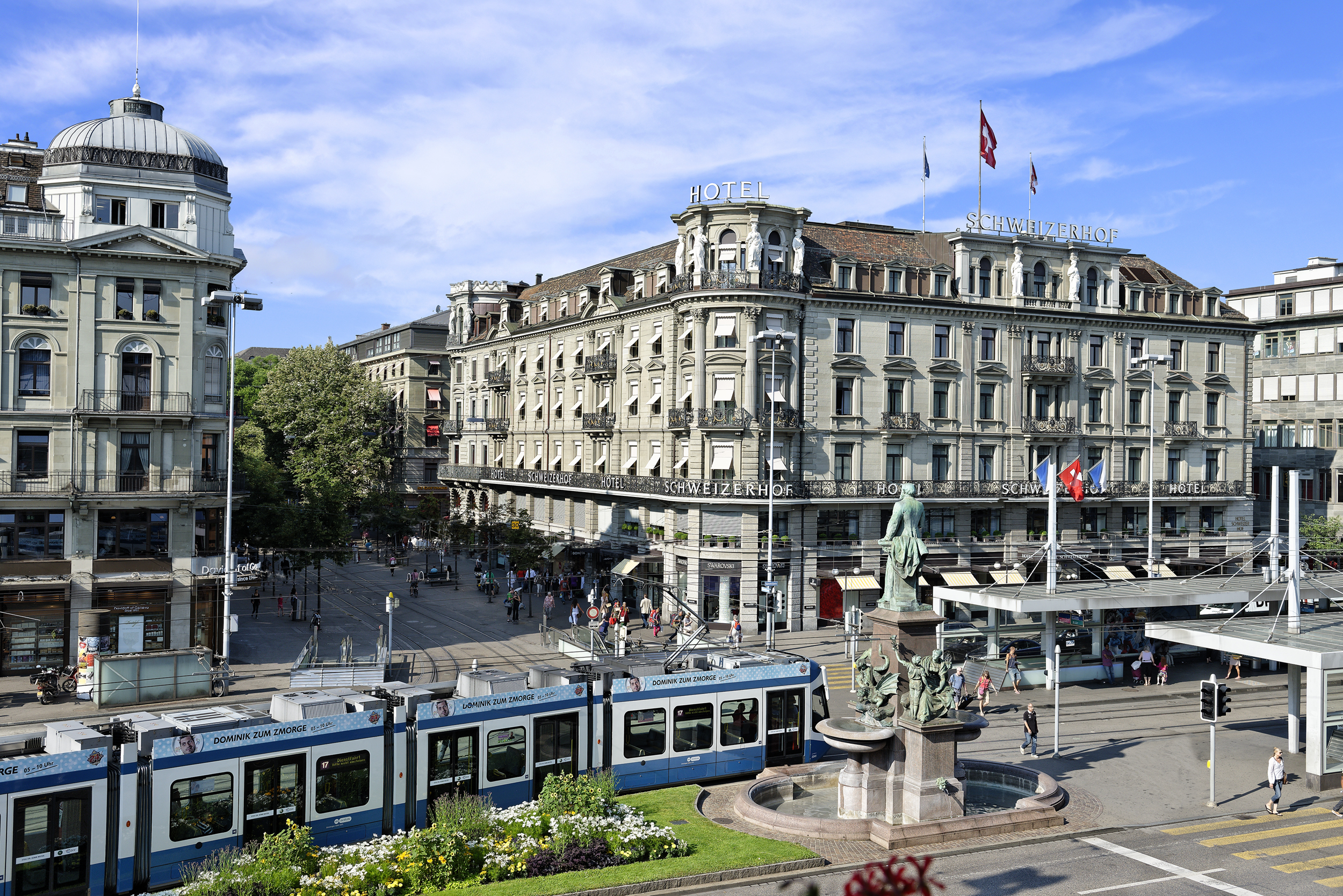
The statue faces south to Bahnhofstrasse, Zurich's main shopping avenue

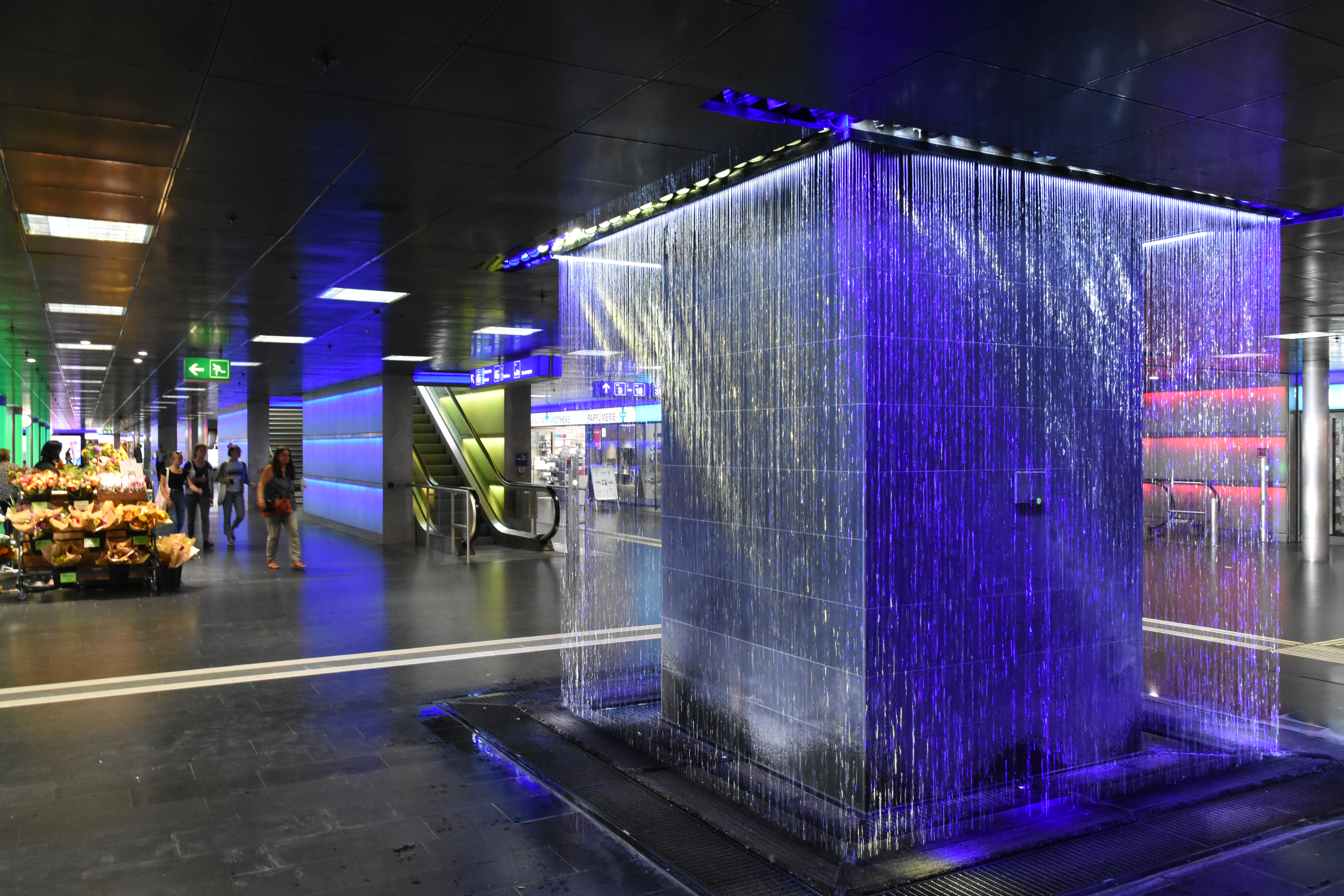
Fountain in ShopVille, below Bahnhofplatz

== See also ==
- Fountains of Zurich
