= Tell Monument =

Memorial to William Tell in Altdorf, Uri, Switzerland

Coordinates: 46°52′54″N 8°38′39″E

The 'Tell Monument' (German: Telldenkmal) is a memorial to William Tell in the market place of Altdorf, Canton of Uri, Switzerland.

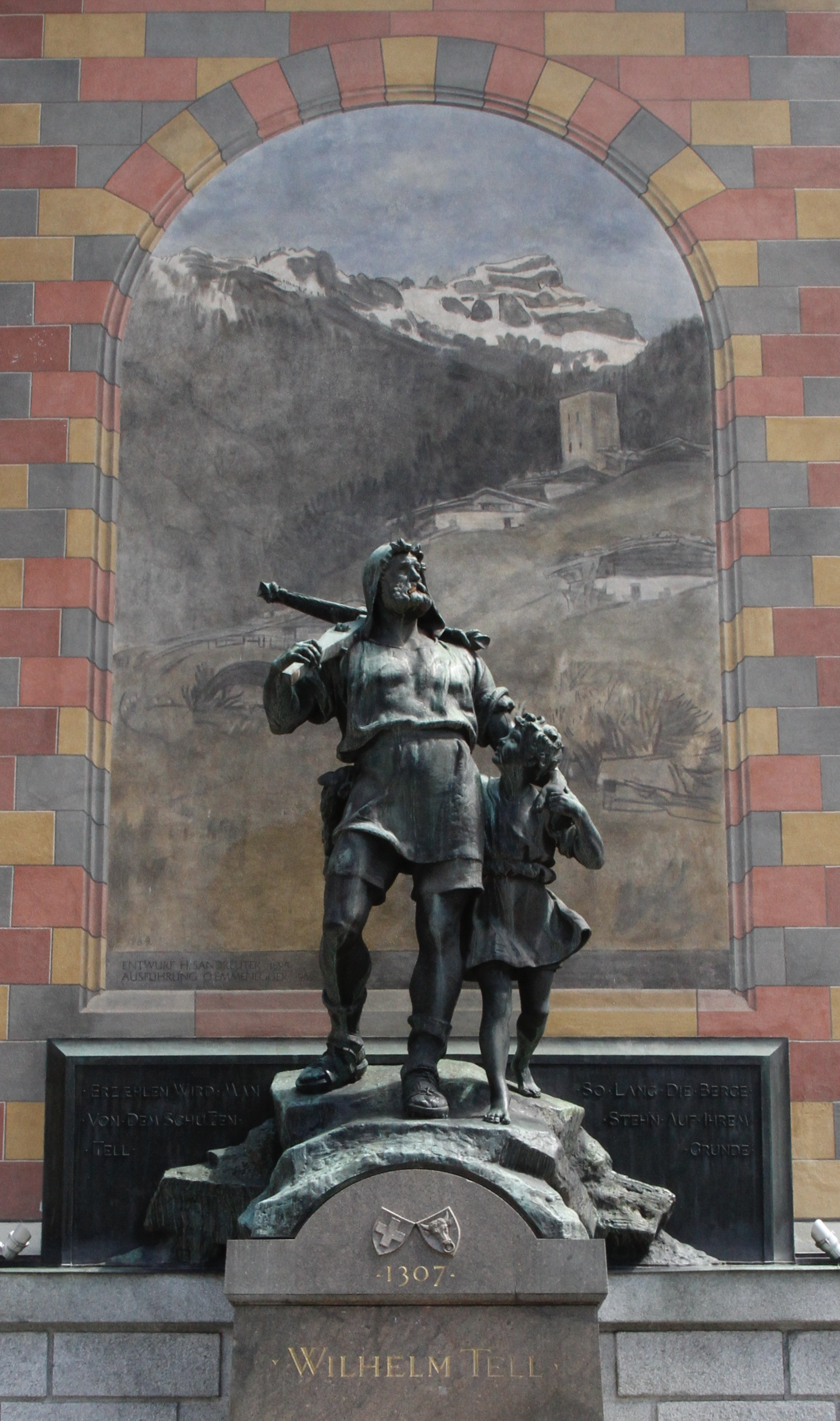
Tell monument in 2022

The bronze statue by sculptor Richard Kissling was inaugurated on August 28, 1895, at the foot of an old tower. It shows the Swiss national hero with his crossbow and accompanied by his son. The traditional date of the Rütlischwur, long thought to have taken place in 1307, is engraved in the base.

== The Legend of Wilhelm Tell ==
Wilhelm Tell is credited with having played a central role for the foundation of Switzerland. After Tell shot the Austria reeve Albrecht Gessler, a Swiss uprising against the Austrian rule began.

When Tell refused to bow before a hat on a pole Gessler had erected in Altdorf, Tell was forced to either shoot an apple placed on his son's head or face death. Tell successfully shot the apple from his son's head with his crossbow. Acknowledging the feat Tell just achieved, Gessler questioned why Tell had prepared for a second shot, to which Tell responded that in case he would have killed his own son with the first bolt, the second would have been for Gessler, and would surely not have missed. Thereupon Gessler ordered Tell to be detained, despite having achieved the requested feat. Tell managed to escape from a rowing boat on Lake Lucerne on the way to prison and shortly after managed to shoot Gessler on his way to his castle with his crossbow.

The factuality of this legend can not be corroborated by historians.

Tell was the inspiration for Friedrich Schiller's play Wilhelm Tell in 1803, and Gioacchino Rossini's opera Guillaume Tell in 1829.

== Older statues ==
Due to the legend, for Wilhelm Tell on several occasions and in different locations a monument was thought for. A Tell chapel was built in 1636 at the place where Tell jumped off the rowing boat from Abrecht Gessler near Sisikon. A prominent one was erected on the Lindensquare in Zurich in 1780. This statue showed father and son together. But the one in Zurich was destroyed a few years later in 1800. In 1856 for Wilhelm Tell a statue was erected at the shores of Lake Lugano in Lugano in the Italian speaking part of Switzerland. It was sculptured by Vincenzo Vela on request by Giacomo Ciani, an Italian immigrant to Switzerland, owner of a Hotel at the shores of Lake Lugano who would become a Member of Parliament. The one in Lugano shows Tell alone and with two arrows in the right hand raised above the head. In 1860, the first Tell memorial was erected in Altdorf. It was created by Hans Conrad Siegried and presented by Zurich, where it adorned the triumph arch of the federal target shooting competition of Zurich in 1859. But this was created out of gypcrust and not of a durable material. The statue had to be repaired and became a target for caricaturists, who questioned the endurance of the national hero. Therefore, the local government demanded a better solution and a definite memorial. With the inauguration of the present Tell, the gypscrust Tell was destroyed.

== Election process ==
In 1866 they asked from the Urner sculptor Heinrich Max Imhof some suggestions. But Imhofs models were deemed as too Greek and not masculine enough. The several Tell models exhibited at the Swiss Expo 1883 also couldn't satisfy. Another unsuccessful attempt to bring a Tell statue to Altdorf was made by a French merchant whose plans were eventually realized in 1901 in Lausanne. In 1887 the Federal Council authorized the financial support of eventual monuments of national character and in 1890 the Federal Art Commission gave its approval to a Tell Memorial in Altdorf.

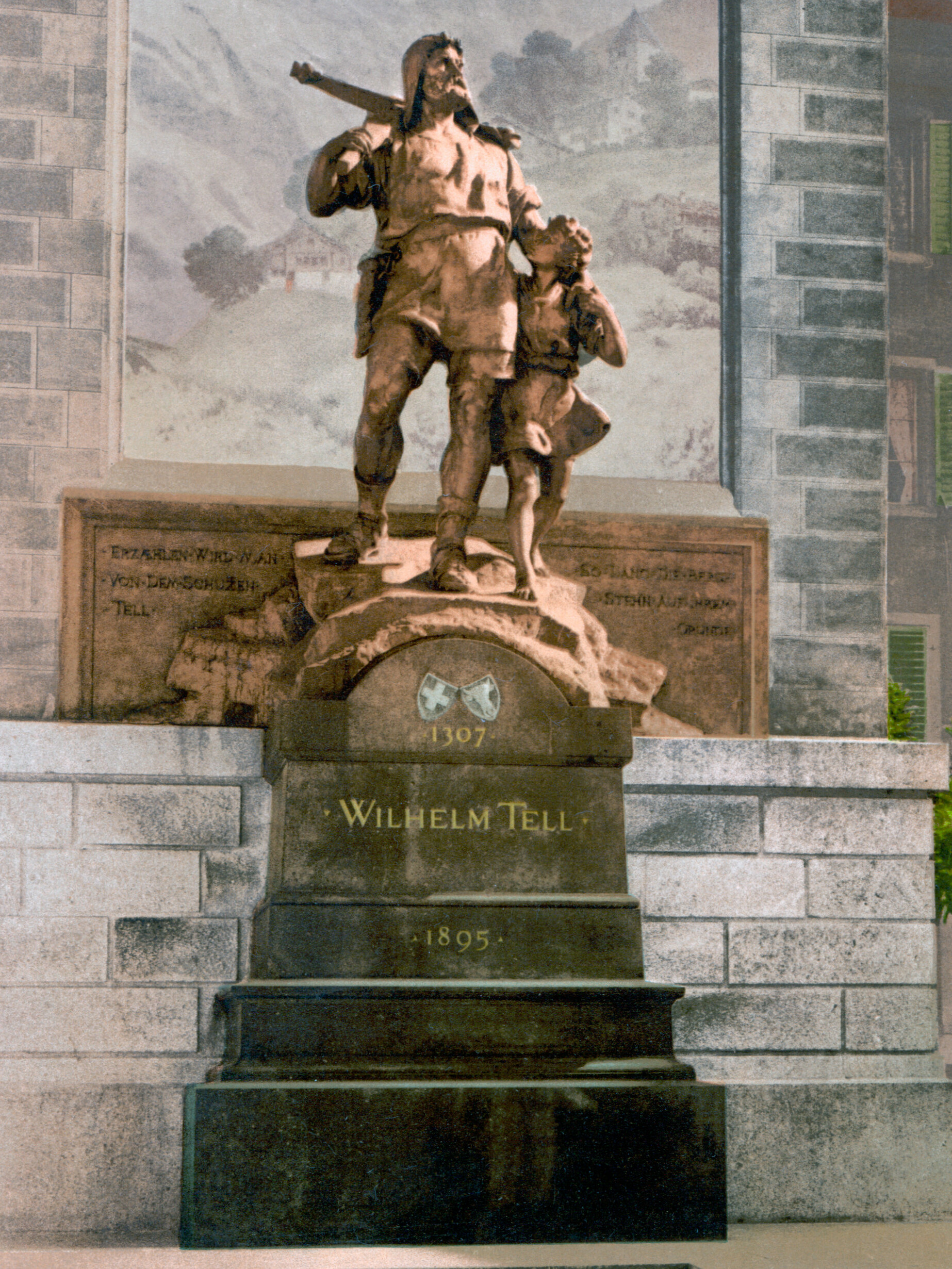
The statue in 1900

A competition on who would become the sculpture was organized in March 1891. The ideas of the commission of Uri were detailed, the tender called for a Swiss representative monument for "all kinds of folks". It should be a static monument and not represent Tell in action. It should not show Tell shooting the apple, nor threatening or killing Gessler nor jumping off Gesslers boat. Such scenes could be arranged in form of reliefs around the base of the sculpture. The statue should show Tell in the moment when he refuses to bow before Gesslers hat and in the peasant's clothes worn at the time. By April 1892, thirty competitors submitted their models anonymously out of which the Urner Commission elected four. Eventually, Richard Kisslings model was lauded the most.

== Realization ==
In June 1892 the Federal Council decided to support the work with 125,000 Swiss Francs. It would pay for the renovation of the tower in front of which the statue was to be located and the monument itself including a pedestal and three bronze reliefs. A life insurance for Kissling in case he would die before the erection of the sculpture was also agreed on, for which Kissling had to pay half of the 30,000.

== Inauguration ==
To the inauguration on the 27–28 August 1895, the important Swiss societies and notables sent a delegation. The Federal Council and the Supreme Court was represented by three members. The executive council of all Swiss cantons sent at least two members. All delegates stayed overnight in Altdorf and on the 28 August the monument was unveiled. Following the Song of Rütli and the Swiss National anthem was sung.

Behind the statue is a bronze plate with the following inscription:
Erzæhlen Wird Man Von Dem Schützen Tell
So Lang Die Berge Steh'n Auf Ihrem Grunde.
This translates to: It will be talked about (in the sense of "stories will be told about") the marksman Tell as long as the mountains stand on their base.
