= Uhrenmuseum Beyer =

Horology museum in Zürich, Switzerland

Coordinates: 47.370802°N 8.538634°E

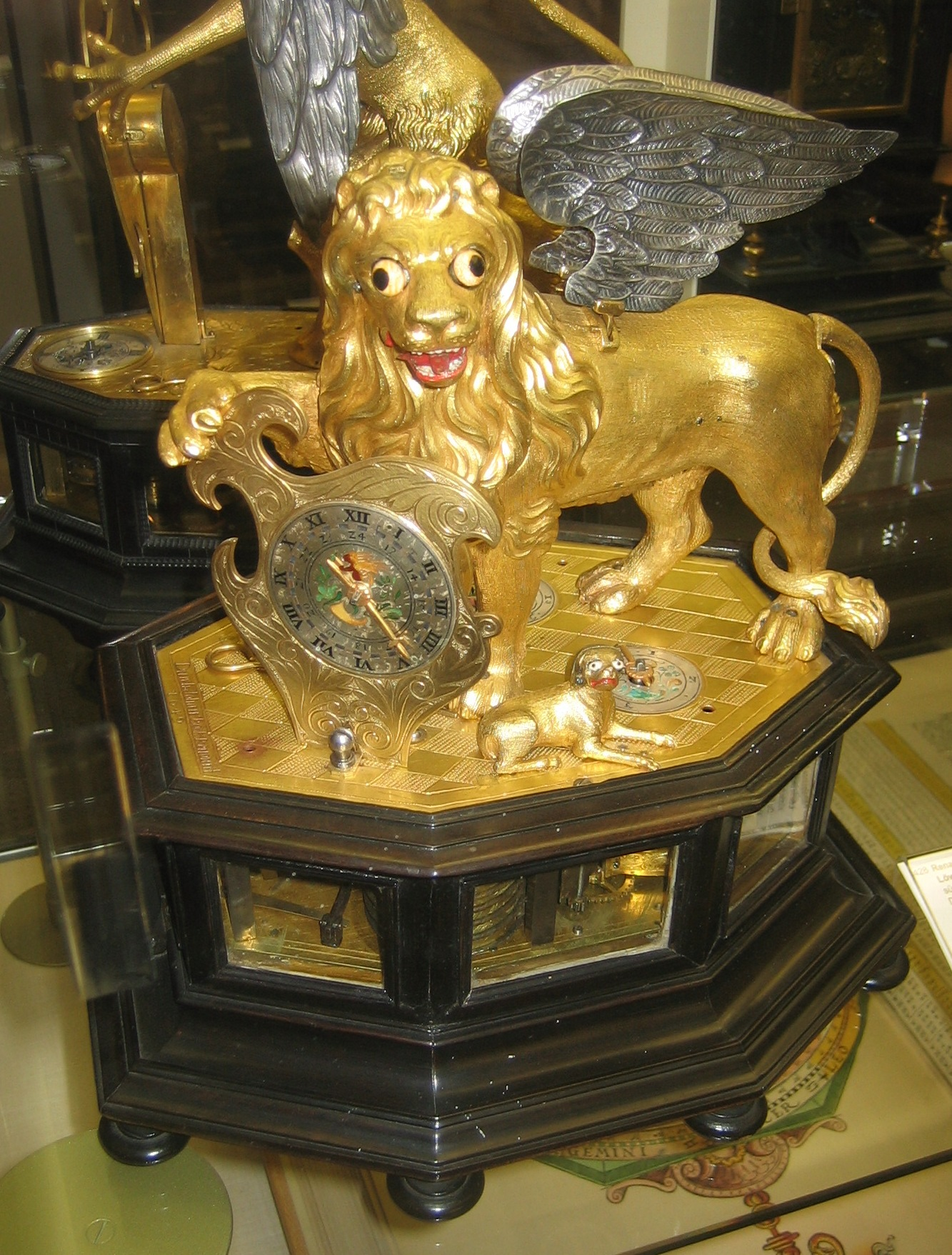
Uhrenmuseum Beyer: Ca. 1640 clock with lion automaton, eyes of both dog and lion move with the beat of the clockmovement

The Uhrenmuseum Beyer (Beyer Watch and Clock Museum) is a horology museum at the Bahnhofstrasse 31, Zürich, Switzerland. It is affiliated with Beyer Watches & Jewellery, a watch retailer and family business.

The core of the museum was acquired during the life of Theodore 'Teddy' Beyer, a pioneer in collecting antique timekeepers. The collection is made up of premechanical timekeepers (sundials, sandglasses, water and fire clocks) as well as clocks and watches from around the world and covering all eras.

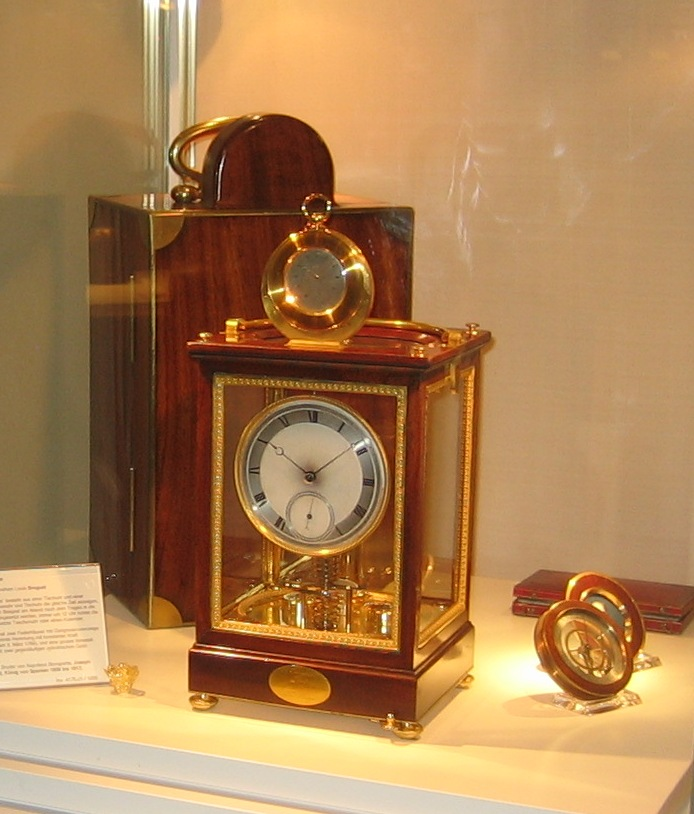
Uhrenmuseum Beyer: Pendule Sympathique, made ca. 1795, by Abraham-Louis Breguet, Paris

The collection is particularly strong regarding early clocks and watches, including several pieces from the gothic and renaissance era, as well as complicated pieces with many complications.

Many of the displayed pieces are unique and/or significant in the history of watchmaking, and therefore are often loaned out to major museums around the world. The collection includes one of the early marine chronometers by Ferdinand Berthoud, a pendule sympathique by Breguet, a pocket watch with astronomical indications by Auch, several bespoke late 20th century watches by George Daniels, one of the few reproductions of the astrarium by De Dondi to name just a few highlights. Furthermore, there are superb Geneva made enameled pocket watches, and a most instructive timeline illustrating the history of the Neuchâtel pendule.

Additionally there is a good small display of locally made clocks and watches including such Zurich makers as Bachoffner, Liechti and Ochsner.

== See also ==
- Horology
- List of museums in Switzerland

Similar museums:

- Deutsches Uhrenmuseum
- National Watch and Clock Museum
- International Museum of Horology
- Clockmakers' Museum
- Royal Observatory, Greenwich
