= Peterhof, Zurich =

Building in Zurich, Switzerland

Coordinates: 47.37049°N 8.53930°E

Peterhof
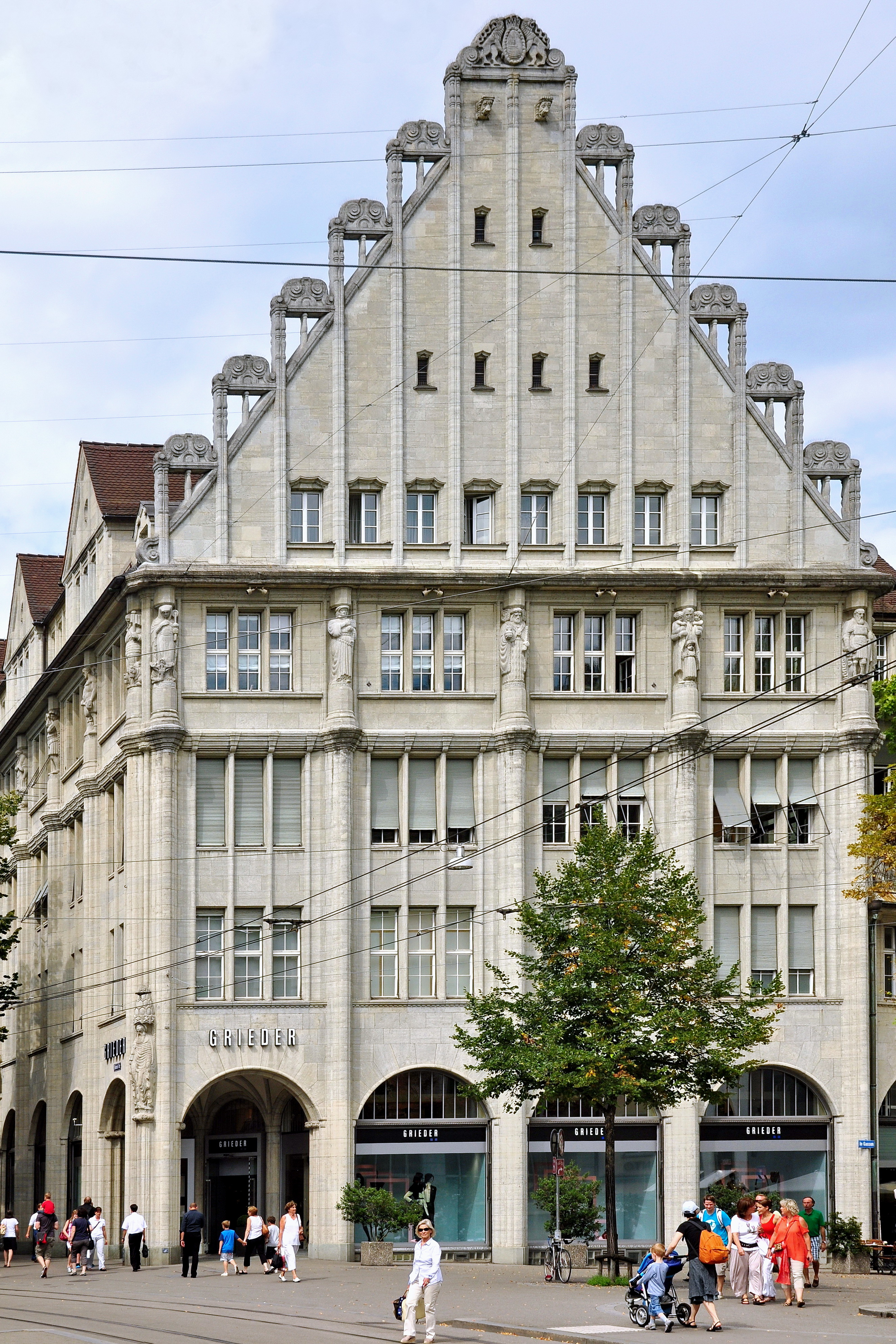
- Looking north from Paradeplatz in 2011
- Alternative names: Grieder-Haus

General information
- Location: Zurich, Switzerland, Bahnhofstrasse 3
- Completed: 1913 (113 years ago)

Technical details
- Floor count: 6

Design and construction
- Architects: Werner Pfister; Otto Pfister

Peterhof (also known as the Grieder-Haus) is a historic six-story building in Zurich, Switzerland. Located on Bahnhofstrasse, at the northeastern edge of Paradeplatz, it was built in 1913 to a design by brothers Werner (1884–1950) and Otto Pfister (1880–1959).

In 2024, after over a century at the location, the Grieder clothing store closed upon the discontinuation of the brand by the Geneva-based Brunschwig family. It was replaced by the family's other brand, Bongénie.

A decade earlier, The Swatch Group acquired the "prestigious building" from Credit Suisse.

The Junobrunnen (lit. 'Juno fountain') stands near the building's southern side.

== Architectural detail ==
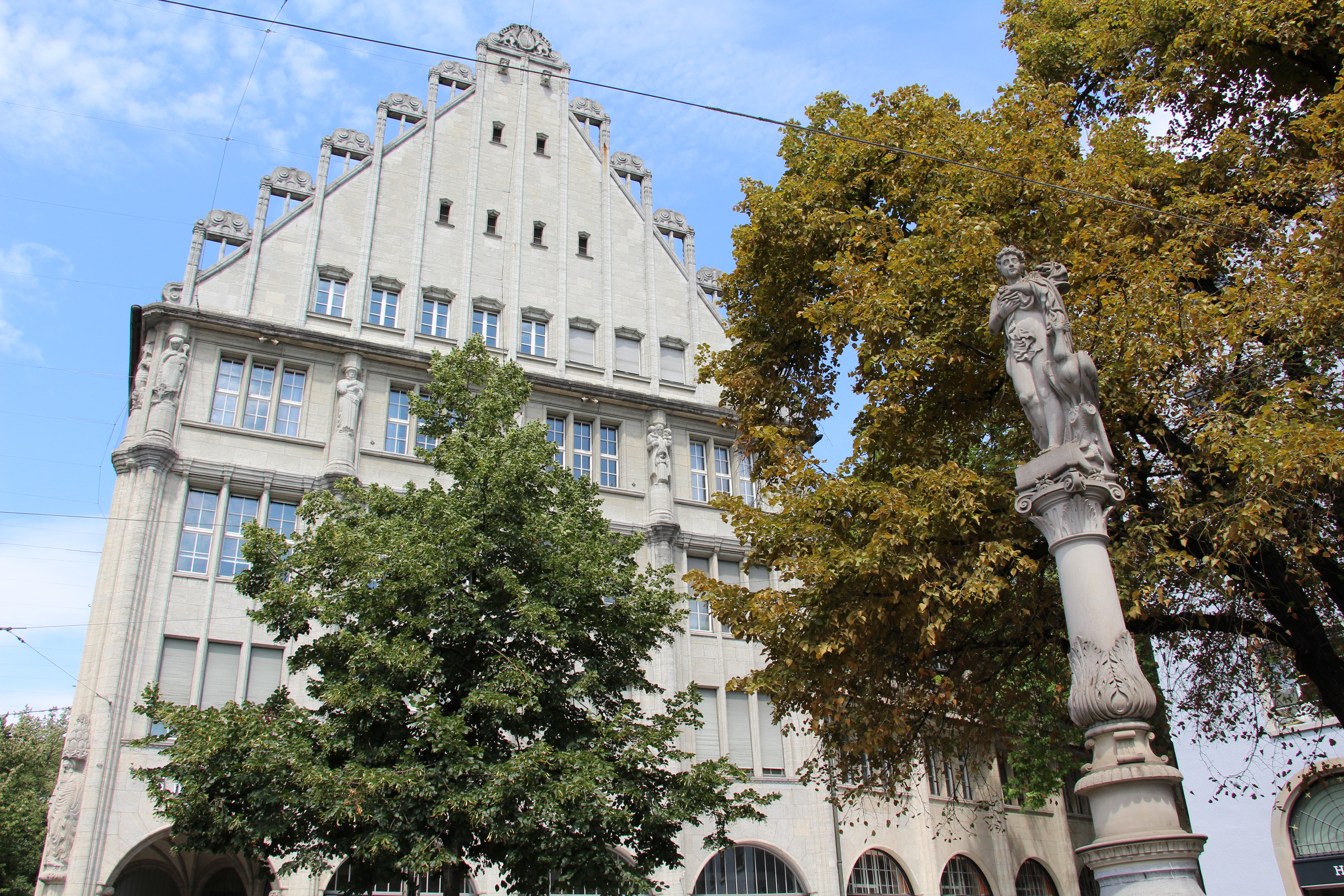

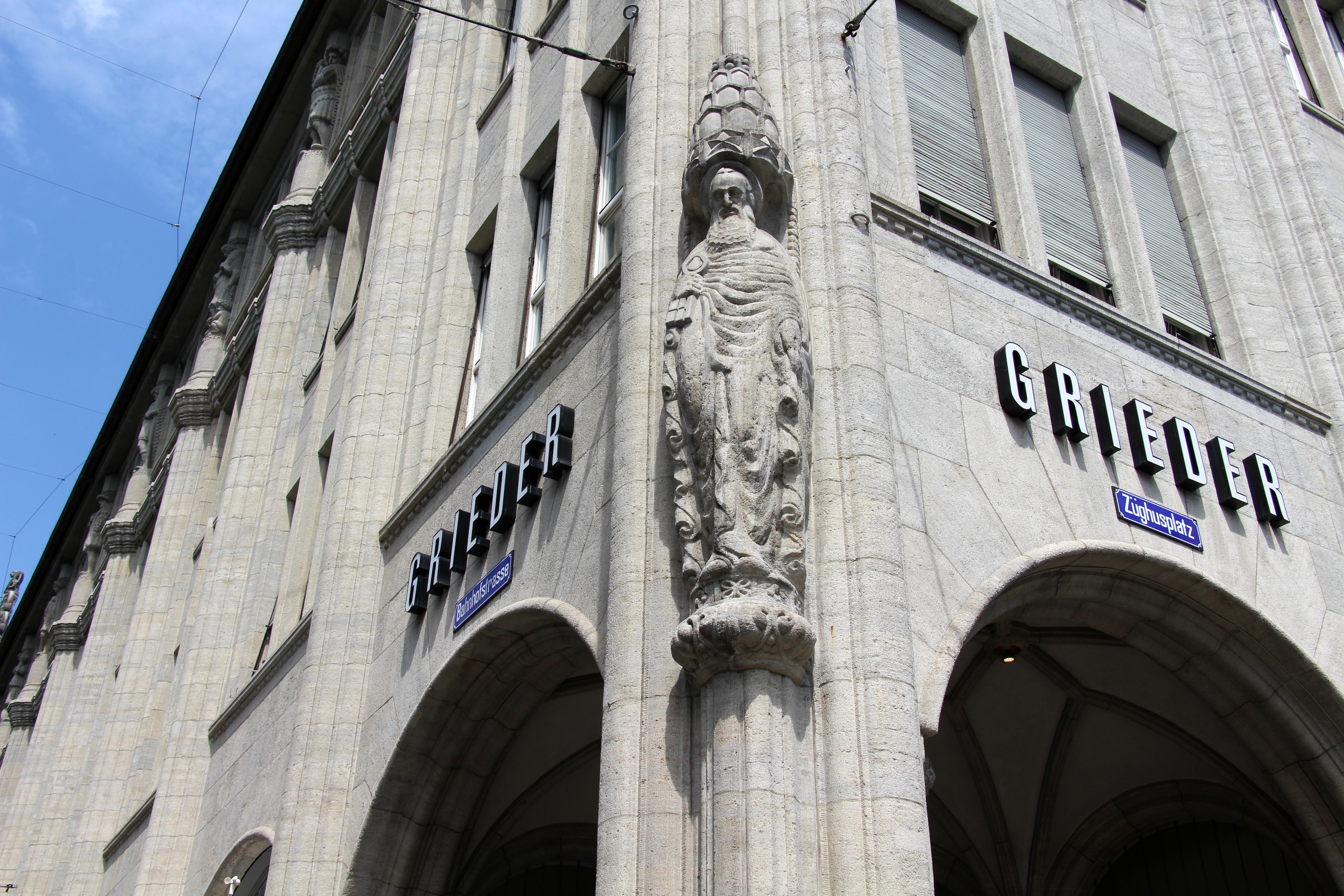

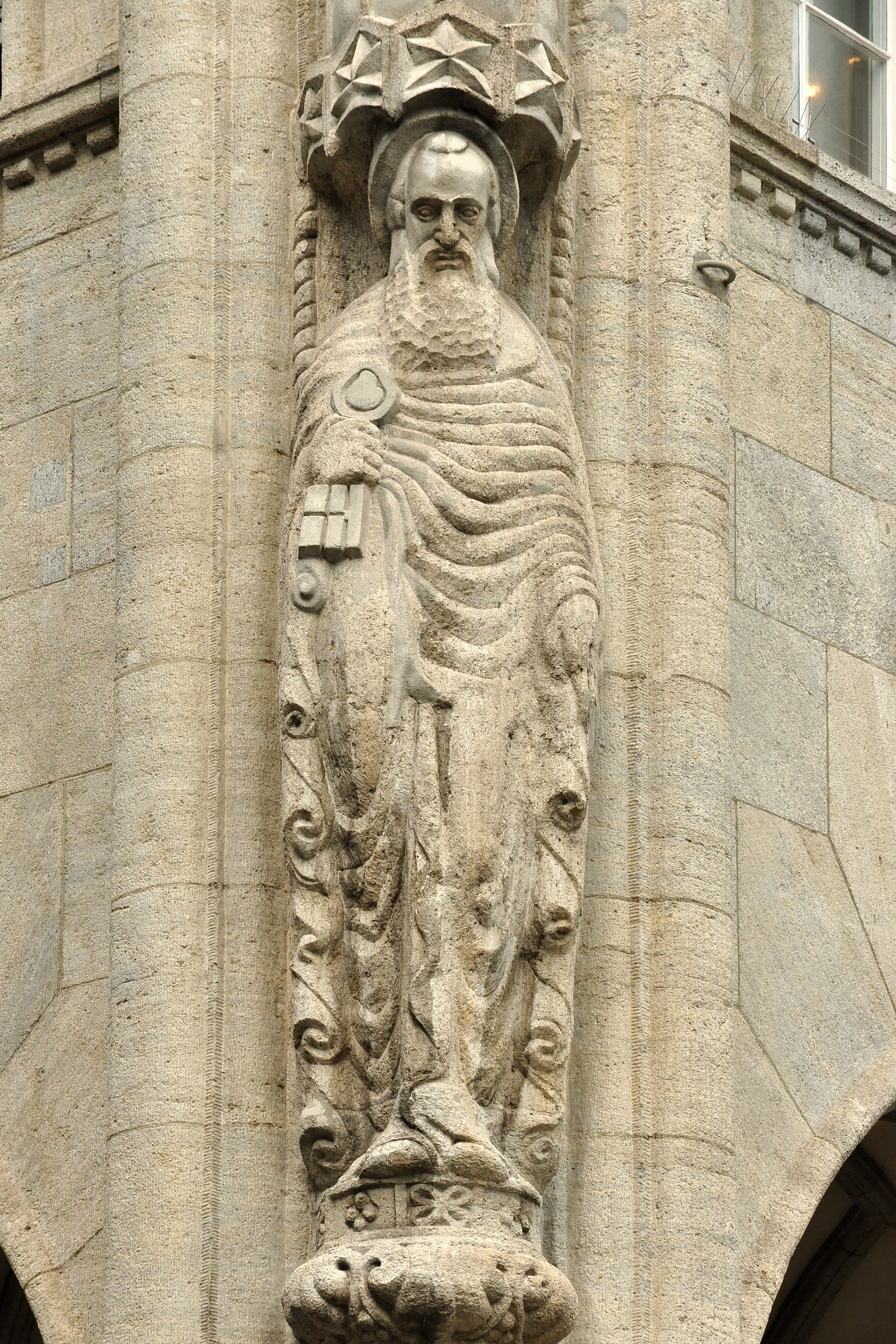

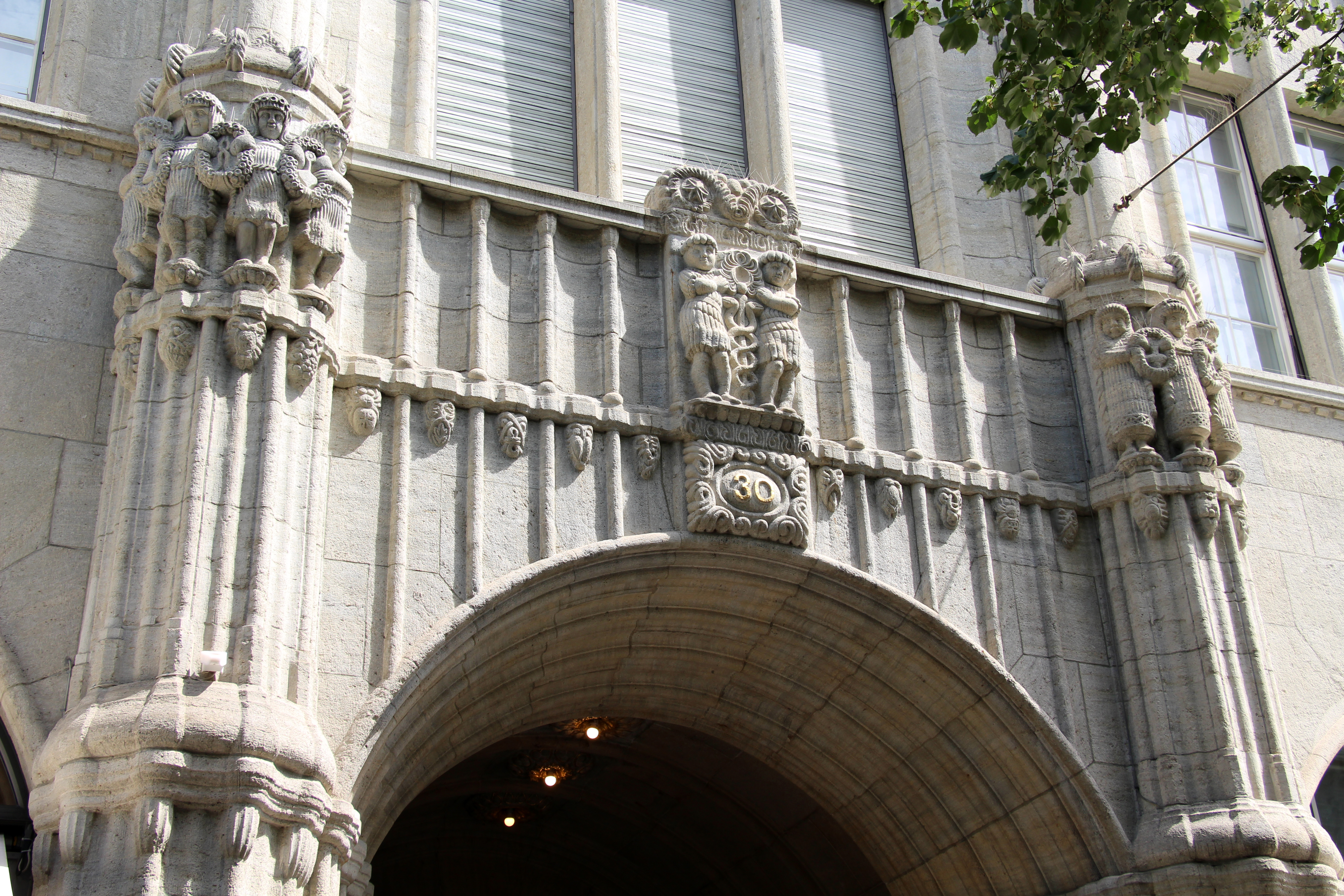
