= Bahnhofstrasse =

Street in Zurich, Switzerland

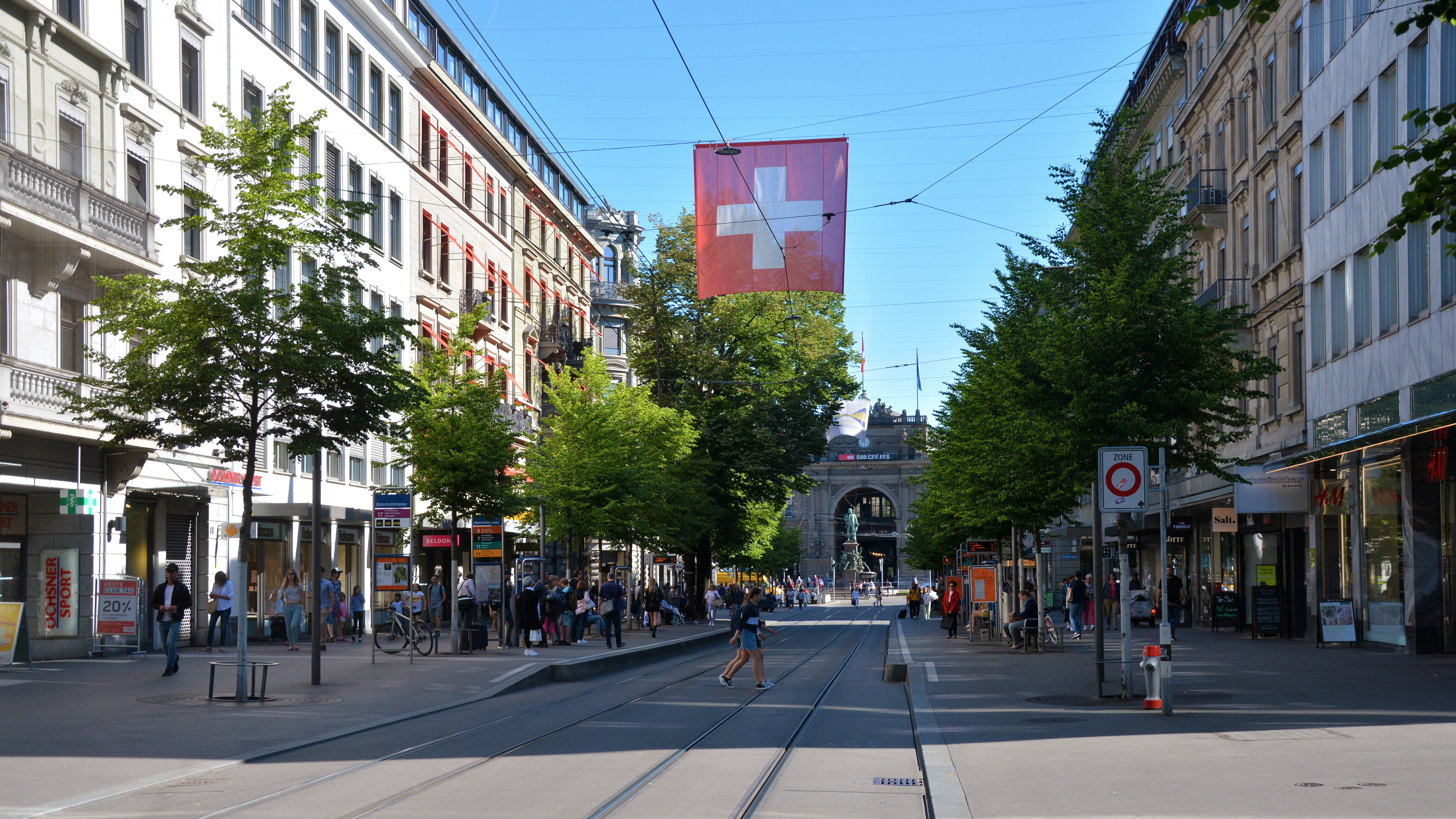
- Bahnhofstrasse, near Bahnhofplatz
- Interactive map of Bahnhofstrasse
- Type: pedestrian zone, road, tramway
- Length: 1.4 kilometres (0.9 mi)
- Addresses: Bahnhofstrasse
- Location: Zurich, Switzerland
- Postal code: 8001
- Coordinates: 47°22′16.99″N 8°32′19.14″E

Bahnhofstrasse (Swiss Standard German pronunciation: [ˈbaːnhoːfˌʃtraːsɛ], lit. 'Railway Station Street'), is the main downtown street of Zurich, Switzerland, and one of the world's most expensive and exclusive shopping avenues. In 2011, a study named Bahnhofstrasse the most expensive street for retail property in Europe, and the third-most-expensive worldwide. In 2016, the street ranked ninth.

== History ==
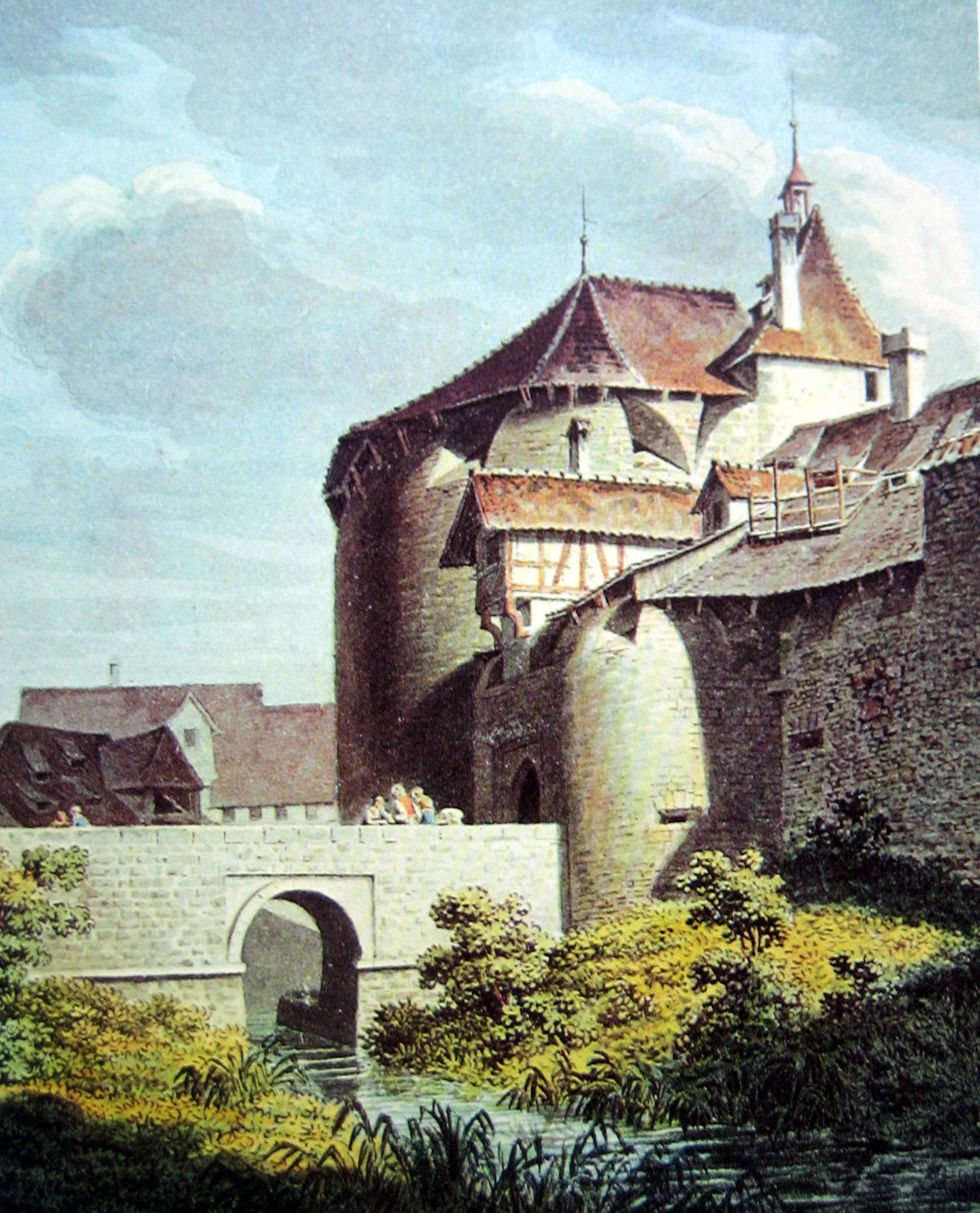
Fröschengraben at Rennwegtor, the Rennweg gate of the former fortifications of Zurich.

Bahnhofstrasse came into existence when the city fortifications were demolished in 1864 and the ditch in front of the walls was filled in. Until that time, the name of the location had been Fröschengraben (lit. 'Ditch of the Frogs'), which then was changed to Bahnhofstrasse.

The street was described as "new" in Baedeker's noted Switzerland, and the Adjacent Portions of Italy, Savoy, and the Tyrol (1867).

== Layout ==
At its northern end, Bahnhofstrasse originates at Bahnhofplatz (lit. 'train station square') in front of the station building of Zürich Hauptbahnhof, the city's main railway station (47°22′40″N 8°32′25″E), and fountain with the statue of Alfred Escher. Running in a mostly southerly direction, it passes the Pestalozziwiese (named after Johann Heinrich Pestalozzi), Rennweg, Augustinergasse and Paradeplatz, before it ends after 1.4 km (0.87 mi) at Bürkliplatz (47.3671°N 8.5409°E) on the northern shore of Lake Zurich.

Paradeplatz, one of the most famous squares in Switzerland, is situated on the southern portion of Bahnhofstrasse. The two largest Swiss banks—UBS and the Credit Suisse Group—have their headquarters there, the former in a building named Münzhof. Another building on Bahnhofstrasse and at the northeastern edge of Paradeplatz is Peterhof. Paradeplatz is also known for its chocolate shop and cafe, Confiserie Sprüngli.

Aside from the many shops (see below), there are also several restaurants and hotels, the Beyer Watch and Clock Museum and the Urania public observatory (the latter is located in Uraniastrasse but very close to Bahnhofstrasse).

=== Shops ===
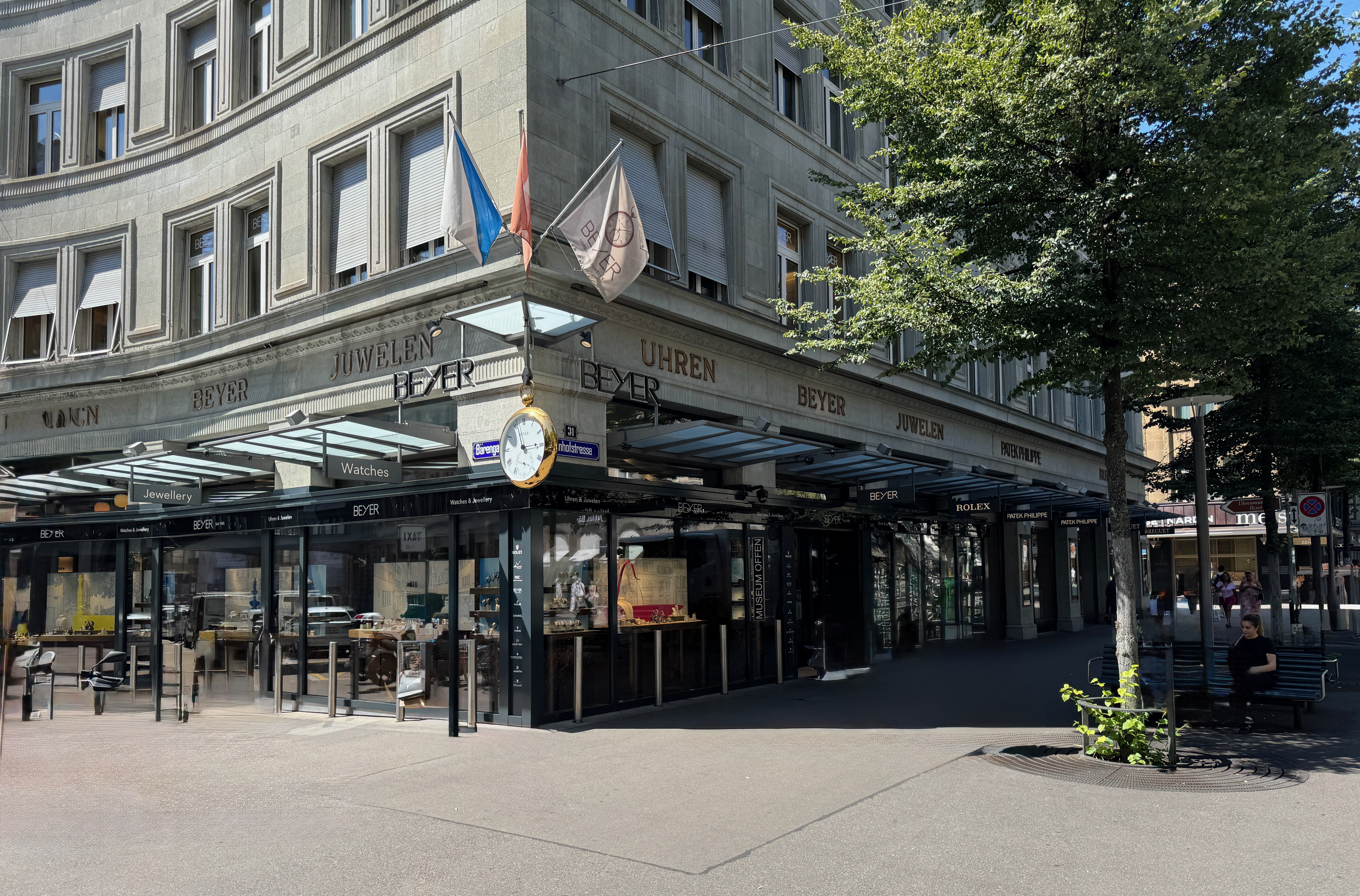
Beyer Watches & Jewellery

Some of the many shops along Bahnhofstrasse include:

- Ambassadour House
- Apple Store
- Beyer Watches & Jewellery
- Blancpain
- Breguet
- Burberry
- Bvlgari
- Cartier
- Chanel
- Dior
- Ermenegildo Zegna
- Franz Carl Weber
- Giorgio Armani
- Globus
- Gucci
- Hackett London
- Hermès
- H&M
- Jelmoli
- Louis Vuitton
- Mont Blanc
- Prada
- Salvatore Ferragamo
- Tiffany and Co.
- Tissot
- Tommy Hilfiger
- Trois Pommes
- Vacheron Constantin
- Victorinox
- Zara

== Transport ==
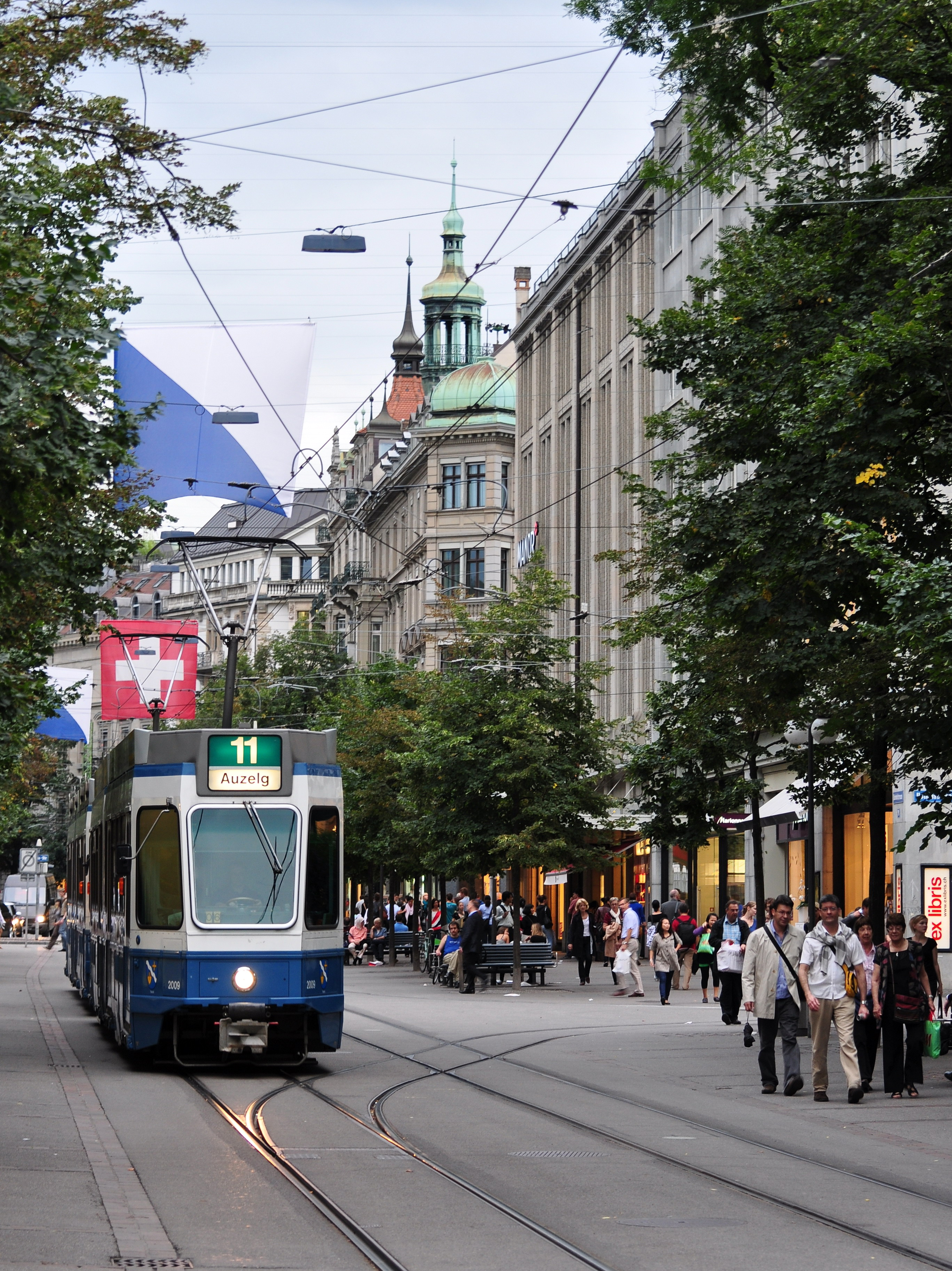
Bahnhofstrasse at Pestalozziwiese

The street is largely pedestrianised, but is also an important link in the Zurich tram network of VBZ.

- North of Paradeplatz, Bahnhofstrasse carries tram routes 7, 11, and 13
- South of Paradeplatz, it carries lines 2, 5, 9 and 11

There are several tram stops along Bahnhofstrasse, named Bahnhofstrasse/HB (near Zurich Main Station), Rennweg, Paradeplatz, Kantonalbank and Bürkliplatz. Nodal stations are at Bürkliplatz, Paradeplatz and Central Station. The Lake Zurich navigation company has a landing stage at Bürkliplatz.

The street is mostly closed to private transport, except for a short stretch near Rennweg, but there are nearby parking facilities. Bahnhofstrasse can also be easily reached from Zurich Airport.

== See also ==
- Europaallee
- Sihlcity
- History of Zurich
- Tourism in Switzerland
- Juno Fountain
