= Switzerland, and the Adjacent Portions of Italy, Savoy, and the Tyrol =

Work by Baedeker

- The title page from the book's 23rd edition in 1909, by which point the final the had been dropped
- Language: English
- Genre: Travel
- Publisher: Baedeker; Dulau & Company, Dulau & Company
- Publication date: 1867 (159 years ago)
- Publication place: Germany; London
- Media type: Hardback book
- Pages: 584
- OCLC: 3054781
- Preceded by: Switzerland, with Neighboring Lakes of Northern Italy, Savoy, and the Adjacent Districts of Piedmont, Lombardy, and the Tyrol
- Followed by: Switzerland, together with Chamonix and the Italian Lakes

Switzerland, and the Adjacent Portions of Italy, Savoy, and the Tyrol was a noted travel book first published under that title in 1867. It was centred on Switzerland but also included parts of Italy, Savoy and the Tyrol. By the book's 23rd edition (published in 1909, containing 584 pages), it contained 72 maps, 19 plans and 12 panoramas. By contrast, the 21st edition contained 63 maps, 17 plans and 11 panoramas.

The book's early editions were published in Leipzig, Germany, by Baedeker, and in London, England, by Dulau & Company. Later editions were published in London by T. Fisher Unwin and in New York City by Charles Scribner's Sons.

Prior to 1867, the book had the longer title of Switzerland, with Neighboring Lakes of Northern Italy, Savoy, and the Adjacent Districts of Piedmont, Lombardy, and the Tyrol. Between 1867 and 1913, it was renamed Switzerland, and the Adjacent Portions of Italy, Savoy, and the Tyrol (dropping the final the in later printings). After a break of nine years, due to World War I, the book was renamed again in 1922 for its final three editions to Switzerland, together with Chamonix and the Italian Lakes. Its 28th and final edition was published in 1938.

== Contents ==
The book has seven chapters:

1. Northern Switzerland
2. Central Switzerland. Lake of Lucerne and Environs. The St. Gotthard
3. The Bernese Oberland
4. Western Switzerland. Lake of Geneva. Lower Valley of the Rhône
5. Chamonix, the Valais and the adjacent Italian Alps
6. South-Eastern Switzerland. The Grisons
7. The Italian Lakes
