= Zurich District =

Coordinates: 47°23′N 8°32′E

Zurich District Bezirk Zürich
- District
- Flag Seal Coat of arms
- Country: Switzerland
- Canton: Zurich
- Capital: Zurich

Area
  - Total: 87.78 km^{2} (33.89 sq mi)

Population (31 December 2020)
  - Total: 421,878
  - Density: 4,806/km^{2} (12,450/sq mi)
- Time zone: UTC+1 (CET)
  - Summer (DST): UTC+2 (CEST)
- Municipalities: 1

Zurich District is a district (German: Bezirk) of the Swiss canton of Zurich in Switzerland.

== History ==
In 1814, the former district of Zürich was established including the municipalities – "Landgemeinden des Bezirks Zürich" (country municipalities) – surrounding the old city of Zürich, the so-called Altstadt. The district of Zürich as it exists today, was created on 1 July 1989, by splitting the former district of Zürich into three parts:

- The western part became the district of Dietikon;
- the eastern part became the district (respectively city) of Zürich with its subdivisions;
- the municipality of Zollikon located east of Zürich was integrated into the district of Meilen.

Therefore, since 1 July 1989, the district of Zürich (SFOS number 0112) shares the same area as the city of Zürich (0261) with its subdivisions totalling 421,878 (as of 31 December 2020) inhabitants on an area of 87.78 km^{2} (33.89 sq mi).

From June 12, 2023, the services of the registration office will still be offered at three central locations: in the Stadthaus, at Oerlikon train station and at Helvetiaplatz. All locations are now available to Zurich residents regardless of where they live. This completes the process of gradually merging the originally twelve district offices, which started in 2017.

== Municipalities (subdivisions) of the district of Zürich ==
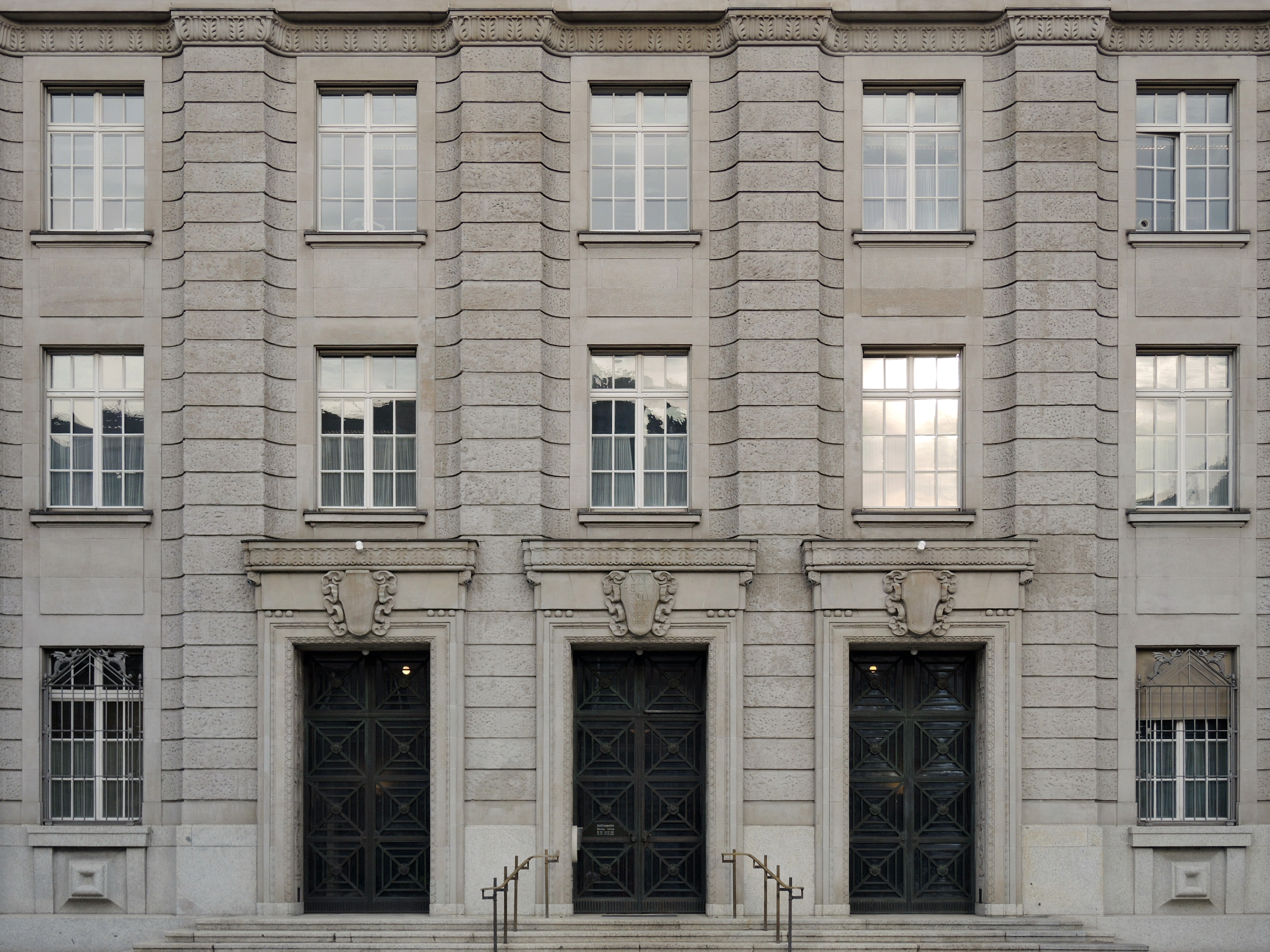
District building (Bezirksgebäude) located at Badenerstrasse in Zürich

Since 1893 respectively 1934 the city of Zürich as well as the district of Zürich are formed by the old city of Zürich (Altstadt) and by a total of 19 former politically independent municipalities:

CoA	Name	Merger	District
Affoltern	Affoltern	1934	11
Albisrieden	Albisrieden	1934	9
Zürich (Altstadt)	Altstadt (Zürich proper)	1893	1
Altstetten	Altstetten	1934	9
Aussersihl	Aussersihl	1893	4 and 5
Enge	Enge	1893	2
Fluntern	Fluntern	1893	7
Hirslanden	Hirslanden	1893	7
Höngg	Höngg	1934	10
Hottingen	Hottingen	1893	7
Oberstrass	Oberstrass	1893	6
Oerlikon	Oerlikon	1934	11
Riesbach	Riesbach	1893	8
Schwamendingen	Schwamendingen	1934	12
Seebach	Seebach	1934	11
Unterstrass	Unterstrass	1893	6
Wiedikon	Wiedikon	1893	3
Wipkingen	Wipkingen	1893	10
Witikon	Witikon	1934	7
Wollihofen	Wollishofen	1893	2

== Mergers and exclusions ==
- 1871: Schwamendingen excluded → Oerlikon
- 1893: Merger of Aussersihl, Enge, Fluntern, Hirslanden, Hottingen, Oberstrass, Riesbach, Unterstrass, Wiedikon, Wipkingen, Wollishofen and Altstadt → City of Zürich
- 1931: Merger of Niederurdorf and Oberurdorf → Urdorf
- 1934: Merger of Affoltern, Albisrieden, Altstetten, Höngg, Oerlikon, Schwamendingen, Seebach, Witikon and Zürich → City of Zürich
- 1986: Zollikon excluded → Meilen District
- 1989: Exclusion of the then remaining 13, excluding the city of Zürich, municipalities → Dietikon District
- 2023: All twelve districts have been merged into 3 central offices

== See also ==
- Municipalities of the canton of Zürich
