= Adlisberg =

Mountain in Zurich, Switzerland

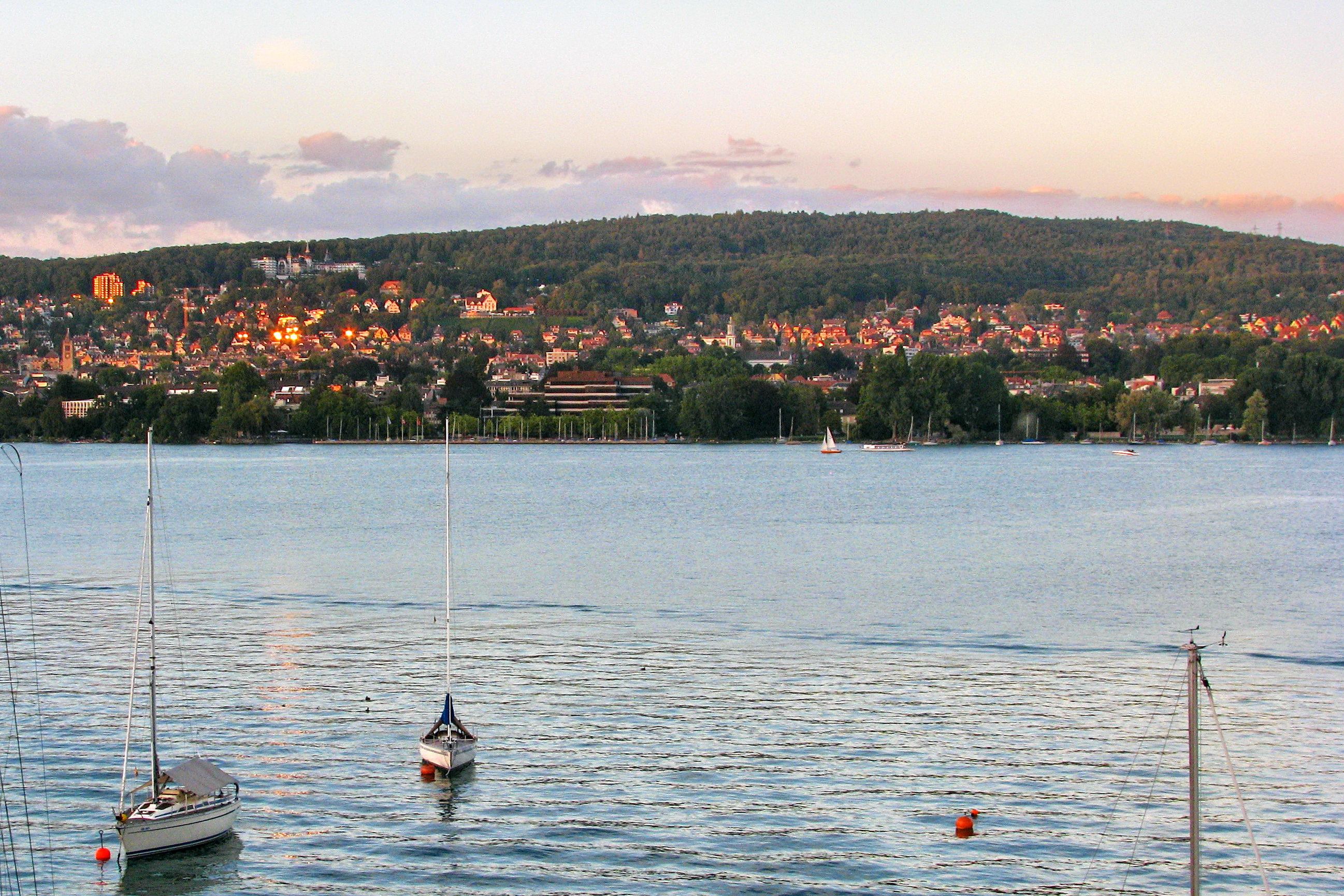
- Adlisberg as seen from the southwest (Wollishofen)

Highest point
- Elevation: 701 m (2,300 ft)
- Coordinates: 47°22′14″N 8°35′34″E

Geography
- Location within Switzerland Location within Canton of Zurich
- Country: Switzerland
- Canton: Zurich

Climbing
- Easiest route: Dolderbahn and bus

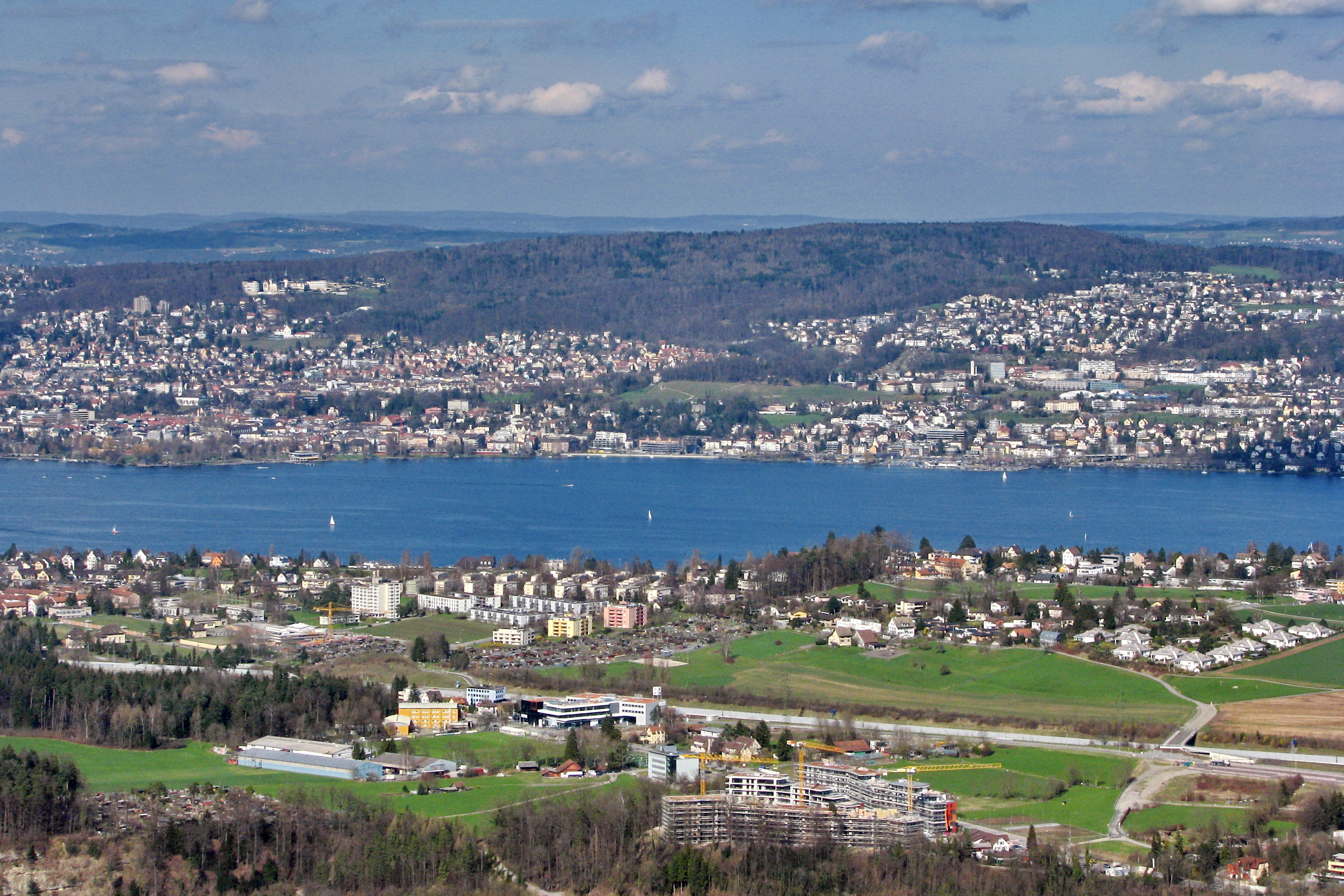
Adlisberg and Lake Zurich, as seen from Felsenegg, Kilchberg in the foreground (April 2010)

Adlisberg, with an elevation of 701 metres (2,300 ft), is a wooded mountain in Switzerland overlooking Lake Zurich (Zürichsee) to the northwest near the Zürichberg.

== Geography ==
Adlisberg mountain is located to the east of the city of Zurich, between the Glatt river valley and Lake Zurich. Its highest point is about 200 metres (656 ft) above the Lake Zurich. The mountain range is part of a chain of hills — among them Käferberg, Forch and Pfannenstiel — between Greifensee (Lake Greifen) and Lake Zurich.

On the southern and western flanks of the Adlisberg are located the Zurich quarters Hottingen, Hirslanden and Witikon. The upper part of Hottingen is called Dolder and is a residential quarter of Zurich. On a terrace on the north side of the city of Zurich are situated the hamlets Tobelhof, Gockhausen and Geeren; the latter villages of the city of Dübendorf.

== Points of interest ==
It is a picturesque location and the lower western side of the hill is now part of the residential district of Zurich. The Zurich Zoo and FIFA's headquarters are located to the northwest, on the plateau between Adlisberg and the Zürichberg respectively the latter one on the southern flank of the Zürichberg. It is also the location of restaurants, hotels, among them the high-levelled Grand Hotel Dolder. At the Grand Hotel Dolder, a small golf course was built. Nearby, on the hilltop, sport courts are situated, among them a popular wave pool (Wellenbad Dolder), a mini-golf course, a Curling hall, tennis clubs, a driving range, and the Dolder ice rink, built in 1930 and considered to be one of the largest artificial ice rinks in Europe. Waldschule Adlisberg aims at children, provided by the city of Zurich.

The upper part of the hill is mostly woodland and a popular recreational area for hiker and biker enthusiasts. On the eastern hilltop, 690 metres (2,264 ft) above sea level, is a 33 metres (108 ft) meter high observation tower located, Loorenkopf nearby Witikon, which offers a panorama over Lake Zurich, Pfannenstiel region and the Glatt Valley. On the northeastern side of the Adlisberg the ruins of the Dübelstein castle are situated; from 1487 to 1489 the home of Hans Waldmann, former mayor of the city of Zurich.

== Transportation ==
The Dolderbahn rack railway runs up to the hilltop, and buses provided by the Verkehrsbetriebe Zürich (VBZ) run between Zurich and the neighbouring communities of Dübendorf, Fällanden and Maur, as well as the Tobelhofstrasse connecting the southeastern parts of Zurich with Glatt Valley and Pfannenstiel region.

== Waldstadt ==
Sigmund Widmer, then Stadtpräsident (mayor) of the city of Zürich, in 1971 initiated the plans for the satellite town Waldstatt (also called Sigi-Ville) for about 100,000 inhabitants, comprising an area of about 4.5 square kilometres (2 sq mi) on the Adlisberg hill plateau. In addition to 30,000 relatively inexpensive housing, 230 classrooms, 10 double gyms, swimming pools, shops, cinemas, churches, a hospital, hotels, a convention center and theater, as well as a subway and underground motorway connections were planned. Thus a completely car-free settlement on the surface would have occurred, but the project was opposed, mainly for ecological reasons, and never realized.

== Gallery ==
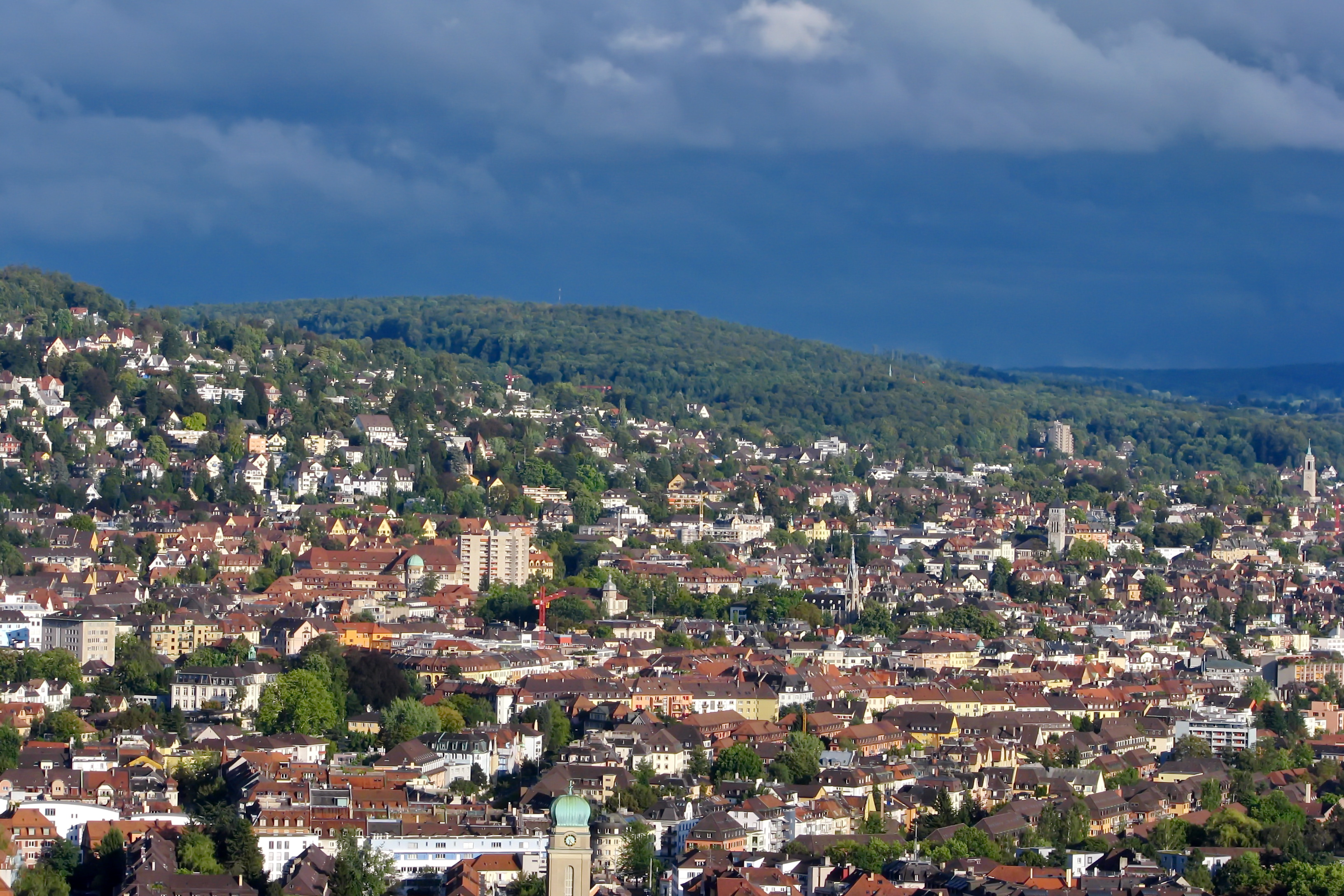
Adlisberg as seen from the north (Käferberg)

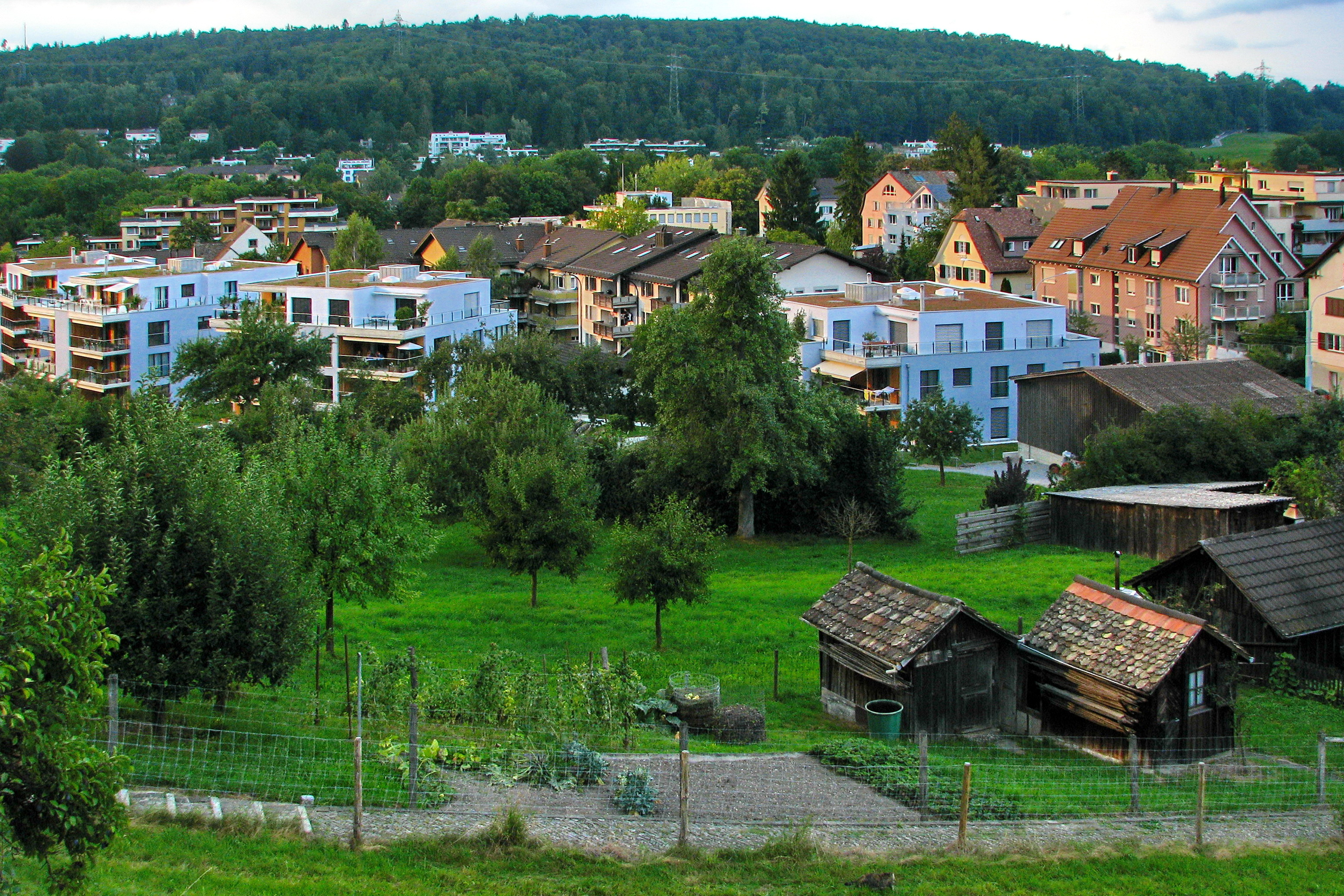
Adlisberg as seen from the south (Witikon)

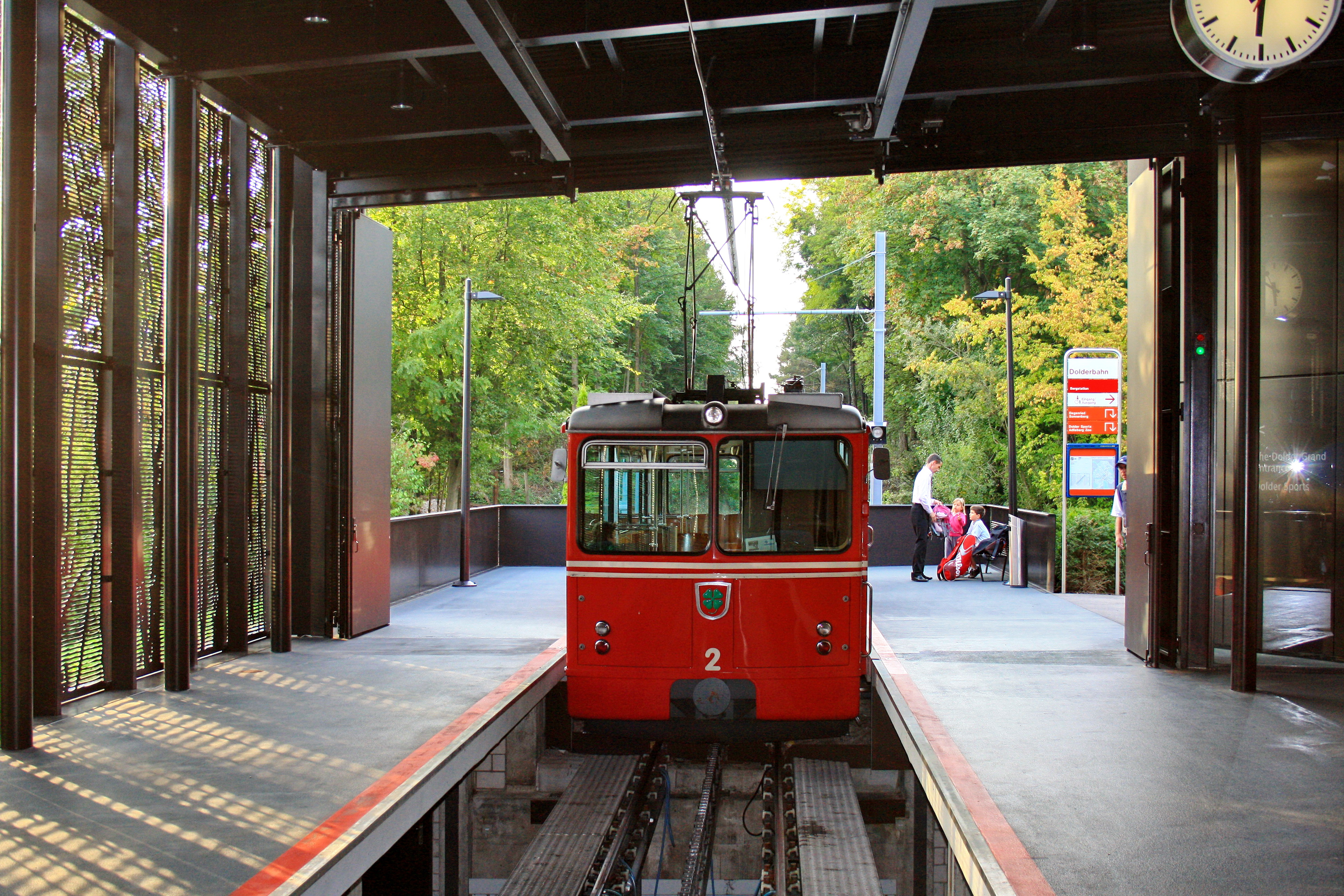
Dolderbahn hill station

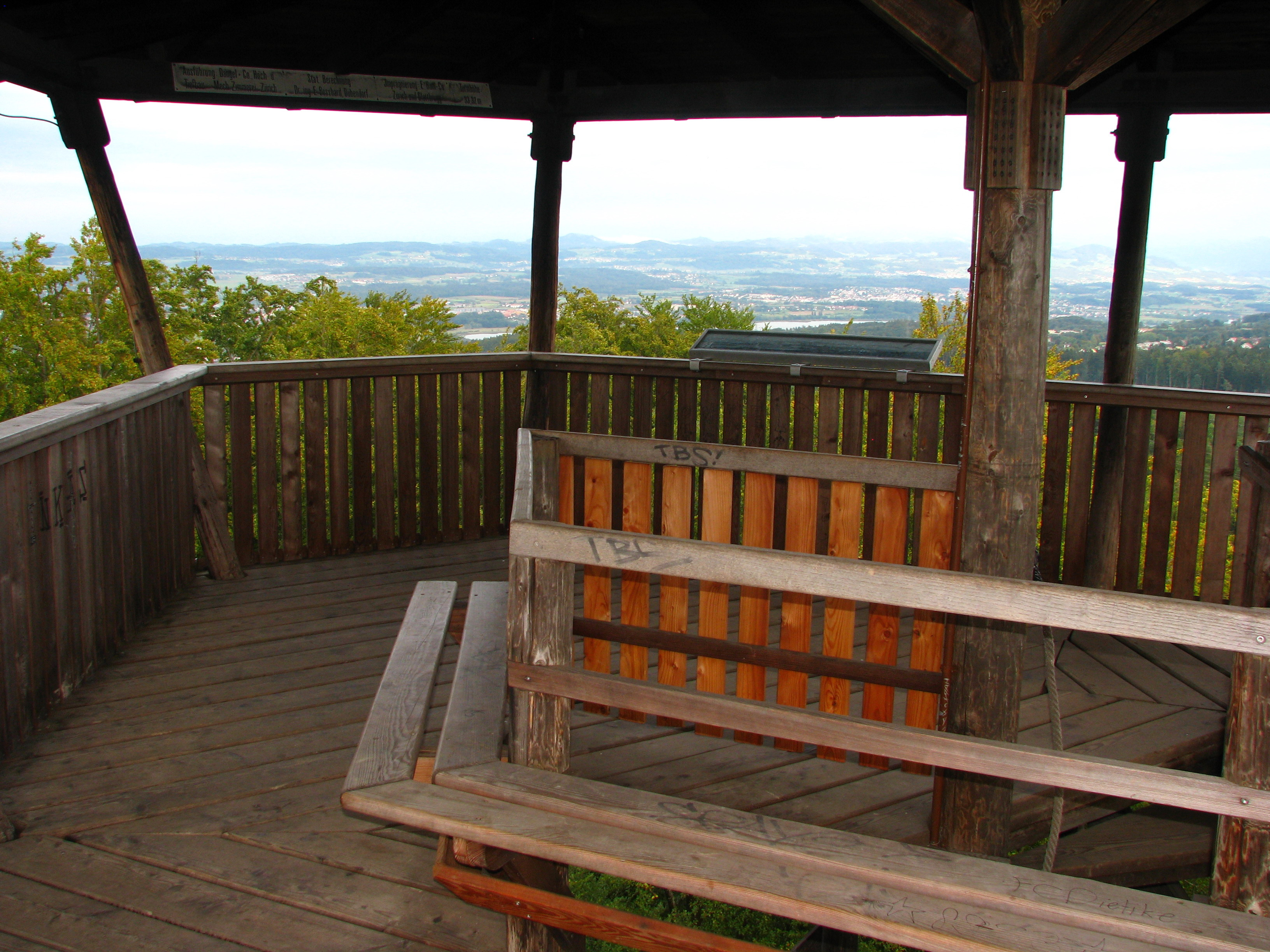
Zürcher Oberland as seen from Loorenkopf tower

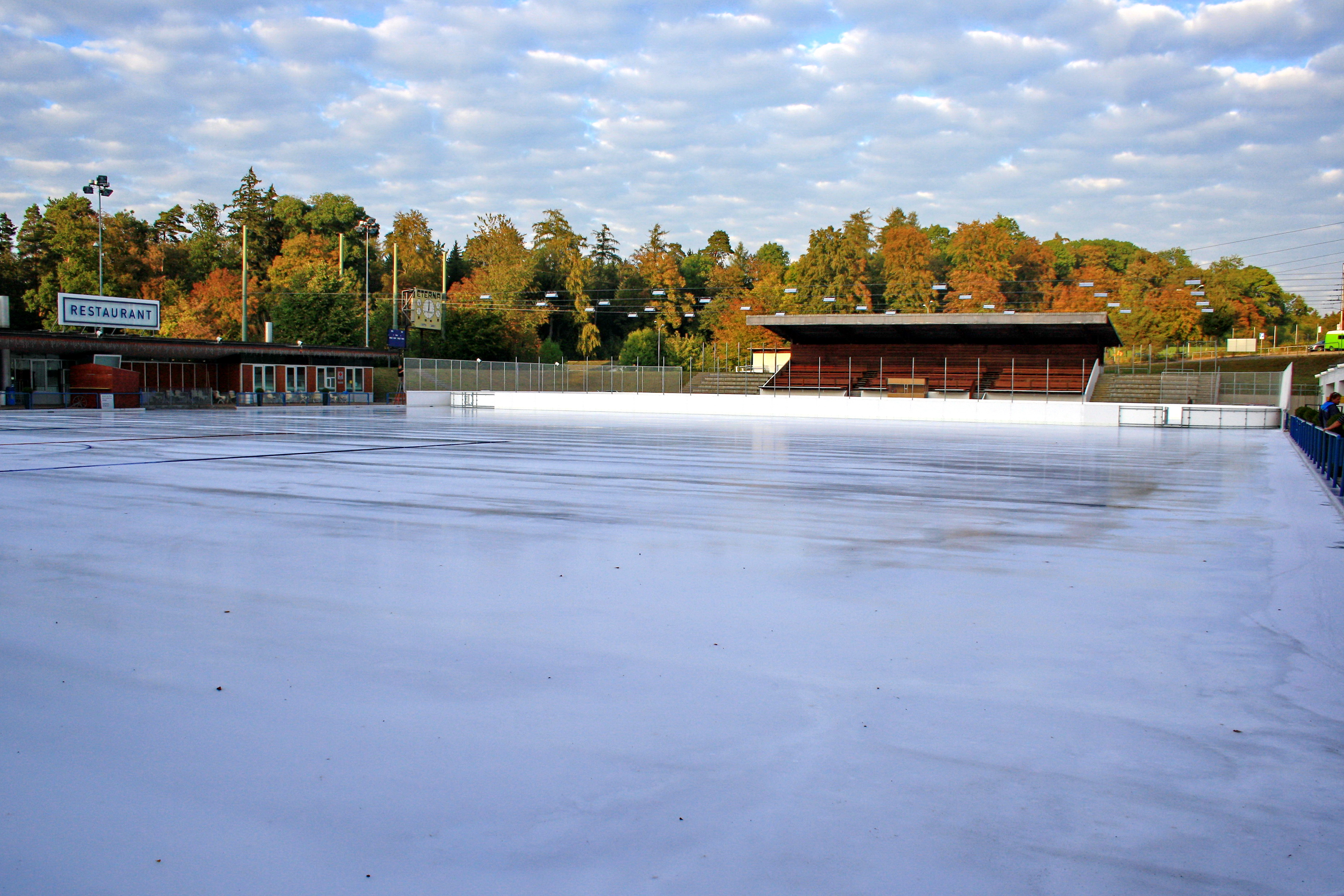
The 6,000 square metres (65,000 sq ft) large ice rink
