= Honegger (surname) =

Honegger is a surname. Notable people with the surname include:

- Arthur Honegger (1892–1955), Swiss composer
- Arthur Honegger (journalist), Swiss journalist
- Blanche Honegger Moyse (1909–2011), American conductor
- Doug Honegger (born 1968), Canadian-born former Swiss professional ice hockey defenceman
- Elise Honegger (1839–1912), Swiss feminist and journalist
- Eric Honegger (born 1946), Swiss politician, member of the FDP.The Liberals party, and manager
- Fritz Honegger (1917–1999), Swiss politician
- Gottfried Honegger (1917–2016), Swiss artist and graphic designer
- Klara Honegger (1860–1940), Swiss suffragist and pacifist activist
- Marc Honegger (1926–2003), French musicologist and choirmaster
- Rosmarie Honegger (born 1947), Swiss lichenologist
- Sylvia Honegger (born 1968), Swiss cross country skier
