= Massnahmenzentrum Uitikon =

Swiss correctional facility for young male offenders

Coordinates: 47°22′07″N 8°26′44″E

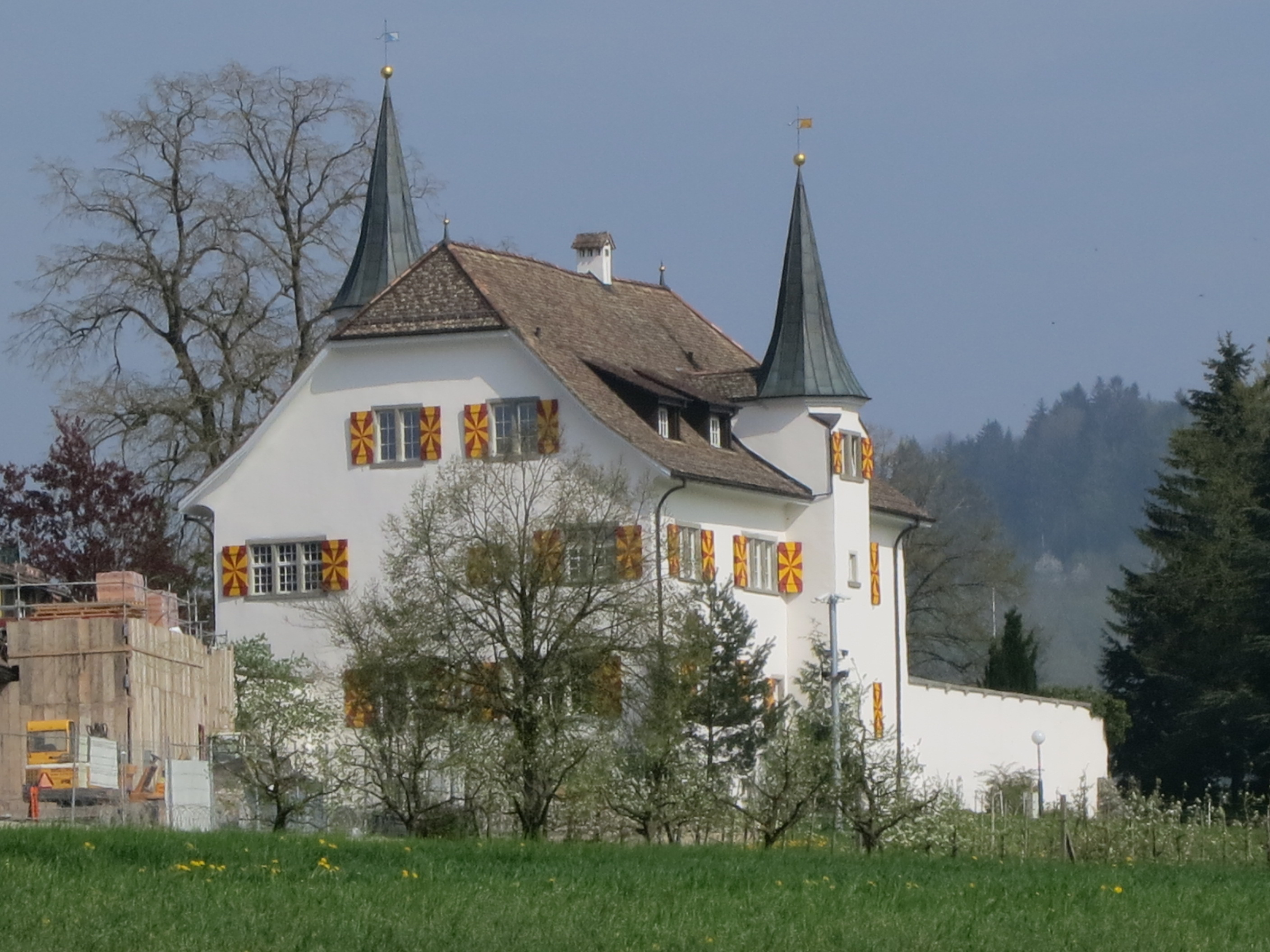
- Interactive map of Massnahmenzentrum Uitikon
- Location: Uitikon, Zurich, Switzerland
- Status: Operational
- Security class: Correctional facility for young offenders
- Capacity: 58
- Opened: 1873 (as hospice for the poor); 2006 (current form)
- Managed by: Canton of Zurich
- Director: Carmelo Campanello

The Massnahmenzentrum Uitikon (MZU), also known as the Uitikon Correctional Center, is a specialized correctional facility for male juvenile and young adult offenders aged 16 to 25 years, located in Uitikon, Canton of Zurich, Switzerland. The facility operates under Switzerland's rehabilitative justice system, focusing on education, vocational training, and therapy rather than punishment alone.

== History ==
=== Early establishment (1873-1926) ===
The institution was originally established in 1873–1874 as a "hospice for the poor" by a concordat of poverty relief organizations from several municipalities in the Zurich District. The founding was prompted by the 1869 renewal of the cantonal constitution, which enabled subsidy payments to reform institutions. The facility was housed in the former baroque residence of the feudal lords of Uitikon.

In 1882, the Canton of Zurich took over the facility's administration. Known as the Korrektionsanstalt until 1926, it accommodated up to 40 adults of both sexes who were accused by welfare authorities of "work-shyness" or "dissolute behavior." Approximately 10% of the inmates were women. The residents were employed in subsistence agriculture, wood processing, a carpentry workshop, and a tailoring shop. In 1920, old dormitories were replaced by a new building (later called the "Burschenhaus") that provided a maximum of 50 places distributed across single, triple, and quadruple rooms.

=== Reform era under Fritz Gerber-Boss (1926-1957) ===
With the introduction of the cantonal law on "the custody of juveniles, neglected persons and habitual drinkers" in 1925, the Zurich institutional landscape was restructured. The correctional institution was transformed into an openly managed work education institution for young men aged 18 to 30 years.

Fritz Gerber-Boss served as administrator from 1926 to 1957 and significantly shaped the new operational concept. Abandoning security measures, he established a hierarchical group system for self-administration by inmates that was considered pioneering at the time. However, with its control and sanction mechanisms and loyalty requirements toward the institution's management, the system increasingly took on totalitarian characteristics, as reports from those affected, especially those of writer Arthur Honegger, documented.

A commission of inquiry appointed by the Government Council identified significant deficiencies in institutional operations in 1954, criticizing inadequate psychological-psychiatric care among other issues. The report was largely inconsequential for Gerber, who took ordinary retirement in 1957; the system of self-managed groups continued, with modifications, at least until the late 1960s.

Under Gerber's leadership, the institution experienced strong growth due to investments by the cantonal administration in this "model operation," increasing its capacity to permanently over 80 places from the late 1930s. The majority of admissions occurred through judicial channels, with an estimated quarter to third of inmates being administratively committed, who often remained in the institution longer than criminal prisoners with stays of up to three years.

=== Modern reforms and media scrutiny (1970s-2000s) ===
Through actions by the home campaign initiated by the 1968 movement and particularly the sensational mass escape of 17 youths in autumn 1971, the institution came under media focus. Criticized practices included punishments such as head shaving, food withdrawal, and weeks-long solitary confinement.

After 1975, significant reforms were implemented, including the 1977 separation of different prisoner groups and the introduction in 1979 of a closed intake unit, where new arrivals are first housed before being moved to other parts of the facility. The latter led to renewed protests from left-wing and autonomous circles in autumn 1979. It also increased care requirements, causing staff numbers to jump to 51 full-time and 14 part-time positions while the number of inmates dropped to around 40 people.

The facility was renamed Massnahmenzentrum Uitikon in 2006. After renovation work, it started with a new operational concept in autumn 2014. As of 2023, the institution offered a total of 64 correctional places.

== Current operations ==
=== Legal framework and admissions ===
The MZU serves as the measure facility for criminal male juveniles and young adults aged 16 to 25 years. The facility has 58 correctional places, with 28 in closed custody and 30 in open custody.

The MZU executes the following legal titles:

- Measures for young adults (Article 61 of the Swiss Criminal Code), which states that individuals under 25 at the time of an offense may receive rehabilitative measures instead of traditional imprisonment if they are deemed to have serious developmental disorders.
- Protective measures for juveniles (Article 15 Para. 2 and Article 15 Para. 1 in conjunction with Article 16 Para. 3 of the Juvenile Criminal Law)
- Prison sentences for juveniles from six months (Article 25 Para. 2 Juvenile Criminal Law)

=== Rehabilitation approach ===
The facility operates on the Risk-Oriented Offender Work (ROTA) concept, which serves as the central guiding model for all areas of the MZU. The goal is to significantly reduce recidivism probability through efficient crime prevention and effective victim protection.

Rehabilitative measures typically last four years and are structured progressively, beginning with the most restrictive environment and gradually providing increased freedom as residents demonstrate behavioral improvements. The facility maintains strict rules regarding personal possessions and electronic devices to encourage residents to focus on rehabilitation rather than entertainment.

Operating costs vary significantly by custody level, with higher security requiring substantially more resources than standard prison facilities. The facility's approach represents a significant financial investment in individual rehabilitation compared to traditional incarceration models.

=== Population characteristics ===
The majority of residents have been convicted of violent crimes, with others having committed serious property or sexual offenses. Many residents present with complex psychological profiles including attention deficit hyperactivity disorder, substance abuse issues, and impulse control problems that contribute to their criminal behavior.

A significant portion of the resident population consists of foreign nationals, creating challenges for long-term reintegration as many face deportation upon completion of their rehabilitation programs.

=== Education and training programs ===
The facility emphasizes vocational education as a cornerstone of rehabilitation, operating nine different training programs including Cooking and food service, Carpentry and woodworking, Metalworking, Automotive repair, Painting and decorating, Gardening and landscaping, Floriculture.

An internal vocational school supports these programs, and residents must complete apprenticeships in their chosen fields. The facility also operates various service enterprises that provide products and services to external customers.

=== Therapeutic interventions ===
The MZU offers comprehensive therapeutic programs including individual and group psychotherapy, offense-oriented therapy focusing on criminal behavior patterns, and substance abuse treatment. The facility provides various therapeutic modalities including traditional talk therapy as well as alternative approaches such as music therapy, art therapy, and physical wellness programs.

The Psychiatric-Psychological Service provides forensic-therapeutic care using cognitive behavioral therapy, gestalt therapy, and person-centered approaches. Residents are required to participate in both individual and group therapy sessions to address their criminal behavior and develop alternative coping strategies.

== Challenges and criticism ==
The facility faces ongoing challenges balancing rehabilitation goals with public safety concerns. Security incidents have occurred over the years, leading to enhanced physical security measures including additional barriers and monitoring systems.

The high cost of individualized rehabilitation programs has generated public debate about resource allocation and cost-effectiveness, particularly given the mixed outcomes for different types of offenders. Additional complications arise from the deportation of foreign nationals who complete rehabilitation programs, raising questions about the return on public investment in these cases.

== Bibliography ==
- Honegger, Arthur: Die Fertigmacher, 1974 (expanded edition with catalog 2004).
- Ziegler, Alexander: "Nacherziehung" à la Uitikon. Ehemalige Zöglinge einer Arbeitserziehungsanstalt berichten, in: Ziegler, Alexander: Kein Recht auf Liebe. Reportagen, Aufsätze, Stücke, 1978, pp. 93–112.
- Honegger, Arthur: Der Ehemalige, 1979.
- Schär, Renate: "Erziehungsanstalten unter Beschuss." Heimkampagne und Heimkritik in der Deutschschweiz Anfang der 1970er Jahre, Licentiate thesis, University of Bern, 2006.
- Furger, Sonja: "Uitikon und seine Anstalt: eine Beziehungsgeschichte. Erster Teil: Von der Anstaltsgründung bis zum Jahr 1926", in: Uitikon. Weihnachts-Kurier, 2007, pp. 7–42.
- Furger, Sonja: "Uitikon und seine Anstalt: eine Beziehungsgeschichte. Zweiter Teil: Die Ära Fritz Gerber-Boss (1926-1957/1961)", in: Uitikon. Weihnachts-Kurier, 2008, pp. 7–52.
- Furger, Sonja: "Uitikon und seine Anstalt: eine Beziehungsgeschichte. Dritter Teil: Ankommen in der Gegenwart", in: Uitikon. Weihnachts-Kurier, 2009, pp. 9–61.
- Honegger, Arthur: Wovon ich rede. Gegen alle Widerstände. Ein autobiografisches Protokoll, 2012.
- Gnädinger, Beat; Rothenbühler, Verena (eds.): Menschen korrigieren. Fürsorgerische Zwangsmassnahmen und Fremdplatzierungen im Kanton Zürich bis 1981, 2018.
- Alltag unter Zwang. Zwischen Anstaltsinternierung und Entlassung, 2019 (Publications of the Independent Expert Commission Administrative Custody, 8).
