= Loorenkopf =

Tower in Zurich, Switzerland

Coordinates: 47°22′10″N 8°35′56″E

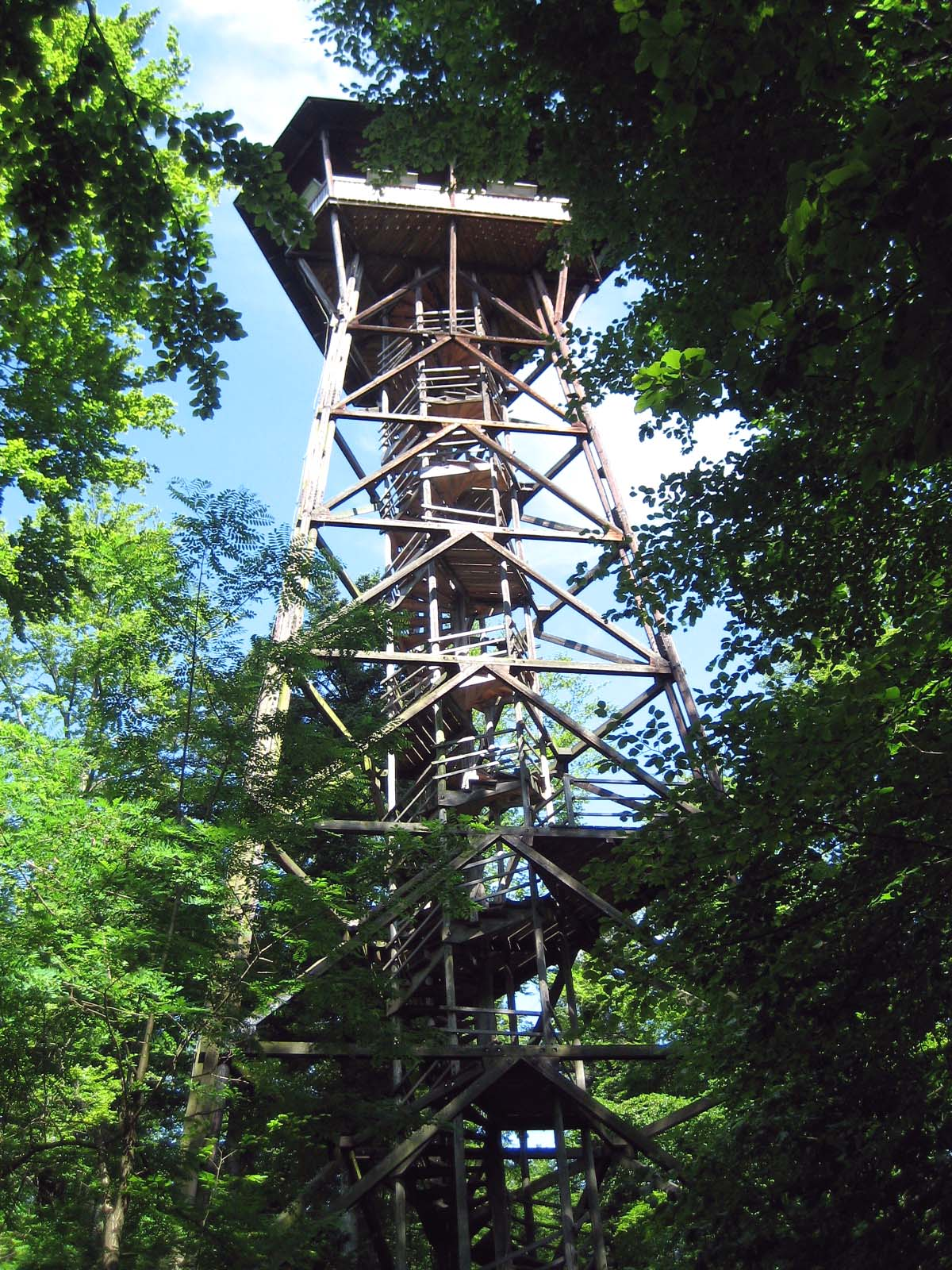
Loorenkopf tower

Loorenkopf tower is a 33-metre (108 ft) high freestanding wood lattice tower on Adlisberg, north of Witikon in Zürich, Switzerland. It was built in 1954. The tower is owned by Zürich city and it is open to the public.

The tower is located within the forest at an altitude of 694 m (2,277 ft). The upper platform is reached by 153 steps. On a clear day with high visibility, you can see Eiger, Mönch and Jungfrau.

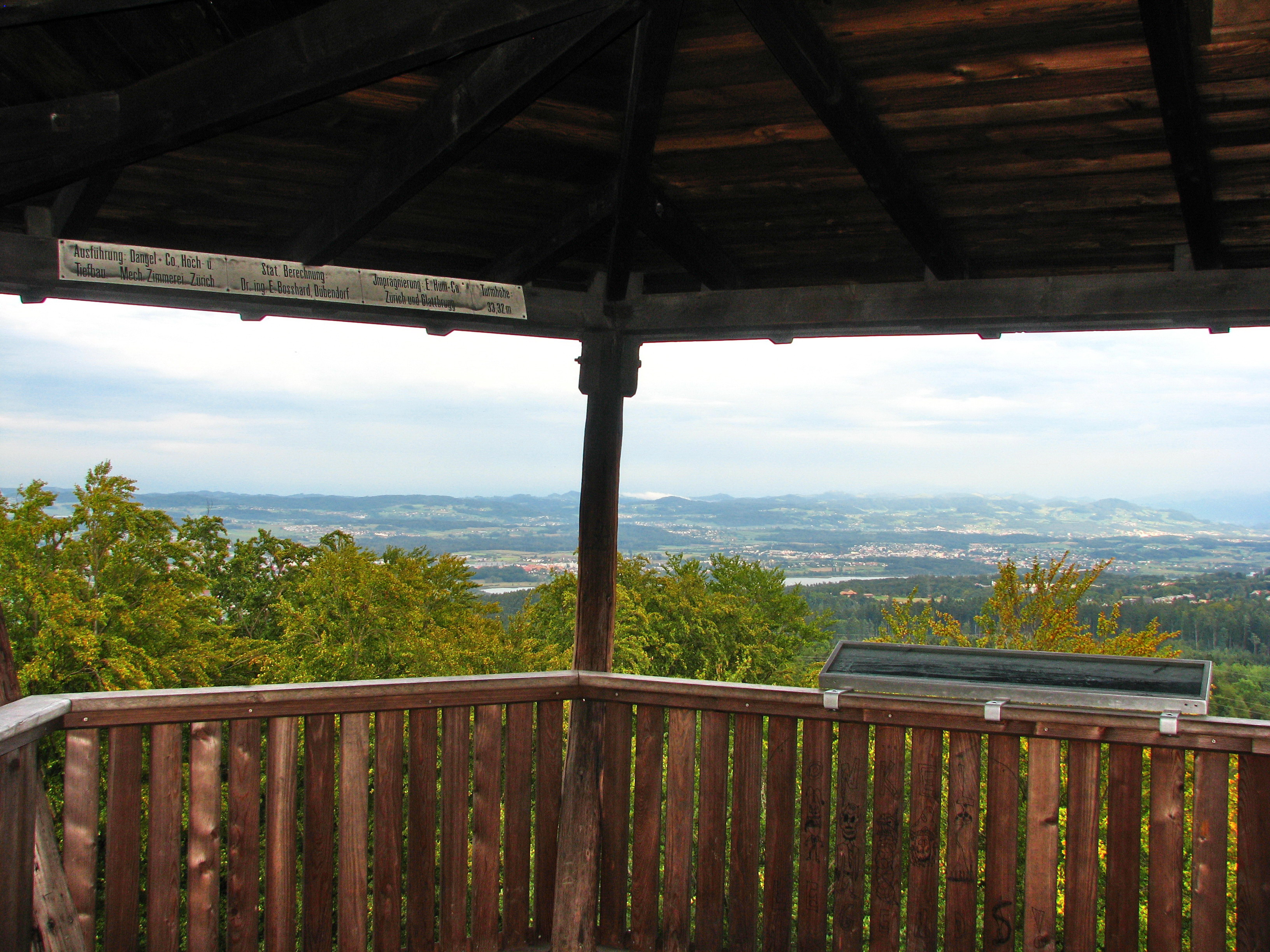
Zürcher Oberland as seen from the tower (September 2009)
