= Katzensee =

Lake in Zurich, Switzerland

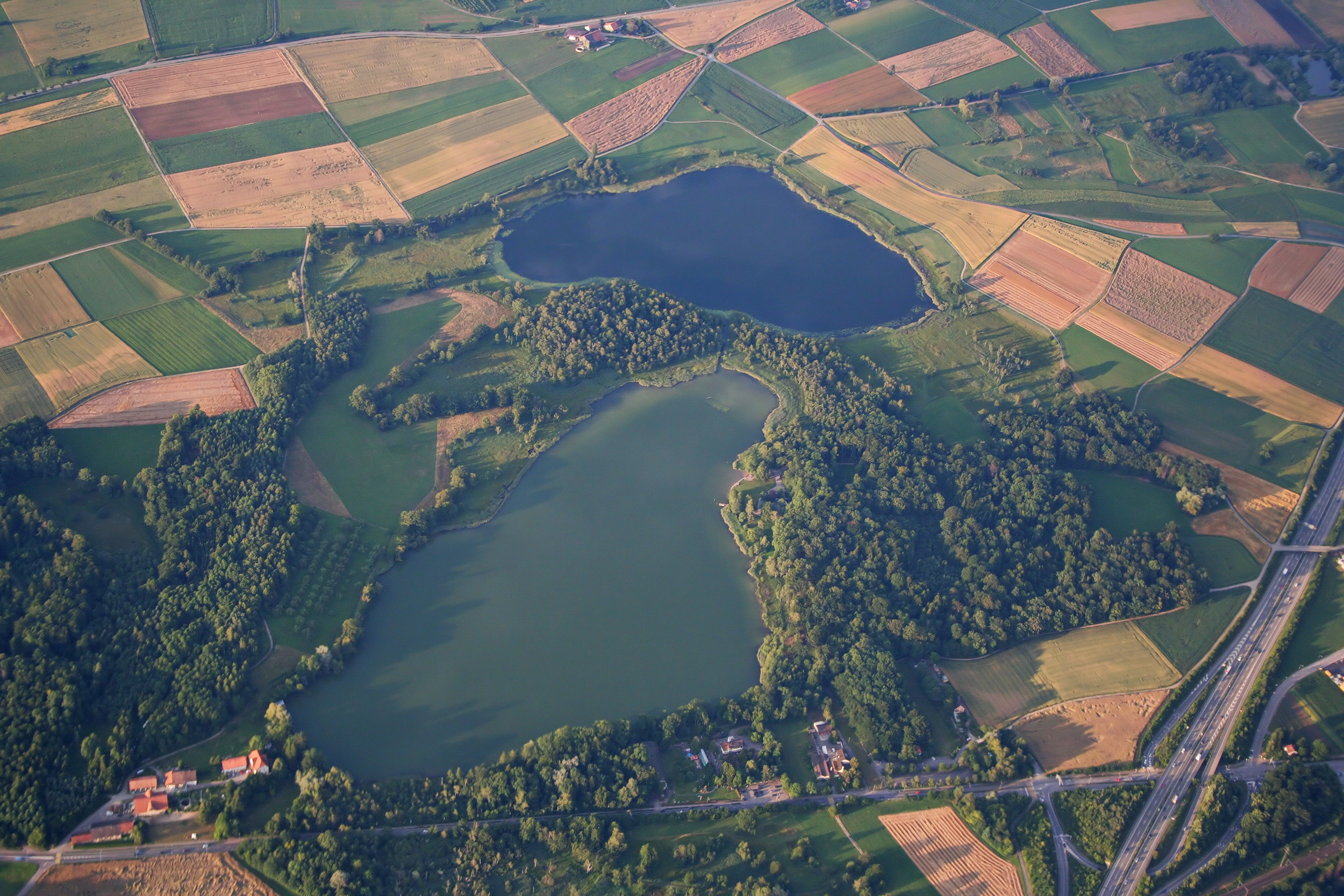

- Location within Canton of Zurich Location within Switzerland Location within Alps
- Interactive map of Katzensee
- Location: Zürich
- Coordinates: 47°25′57″N 8°29′34″E
- Basin countries: Switzerland
- Surface area: 36 ha (89 acres)
- Max. depth: 8 m (26 ft)
- Surface elevation: 439 m (1,440 ft)

Katzensee is a lake on the border of the city of Zürich and Regensdorf in the Canton of Zürich, Switzerland. Its surface area is 36 ha (89 acres). There is also a public bath/lido Strandbad Katzensee on its southern shore.

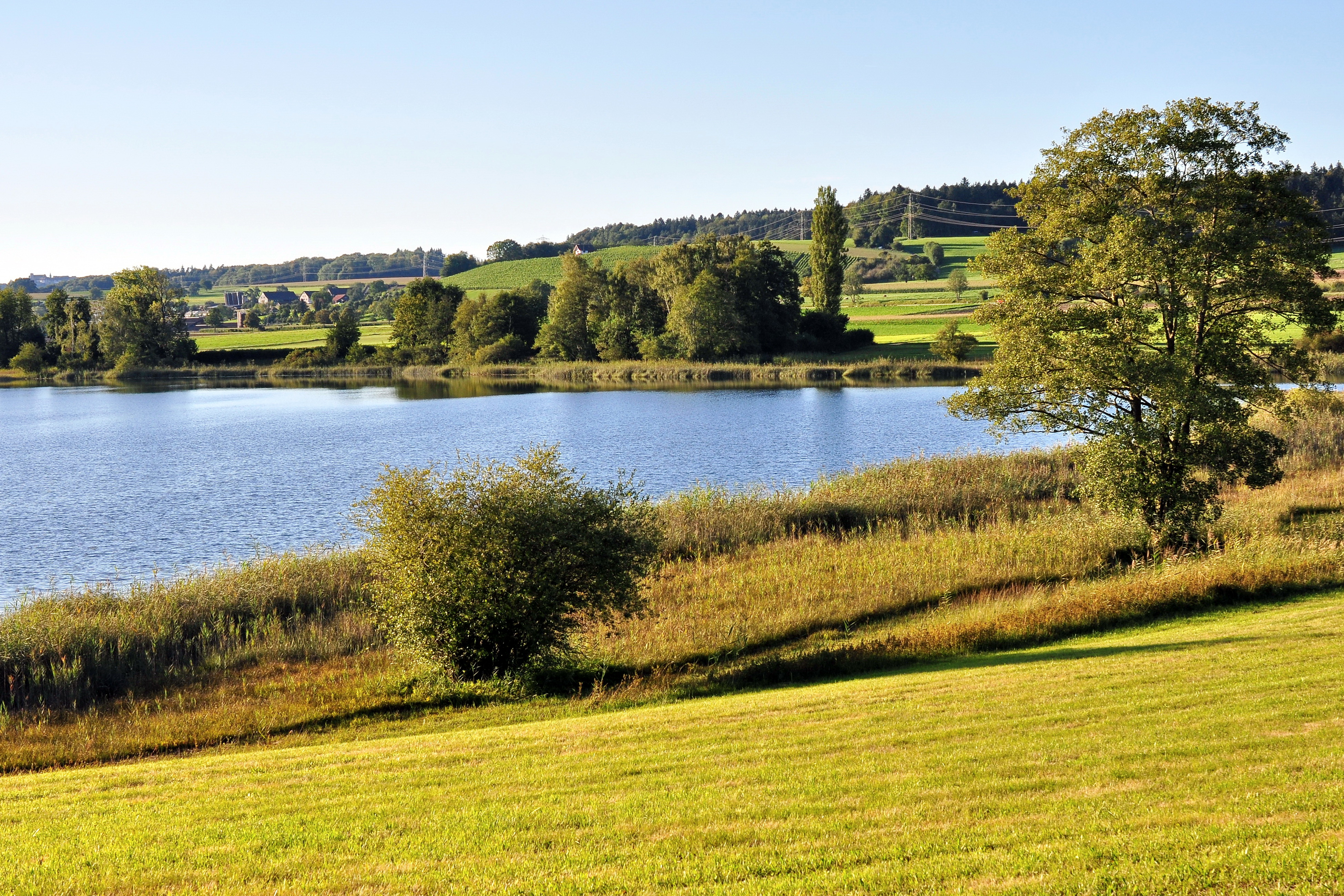
oberer (upper) Katzensee, Zürich-Affoltern in the background (April 2009)

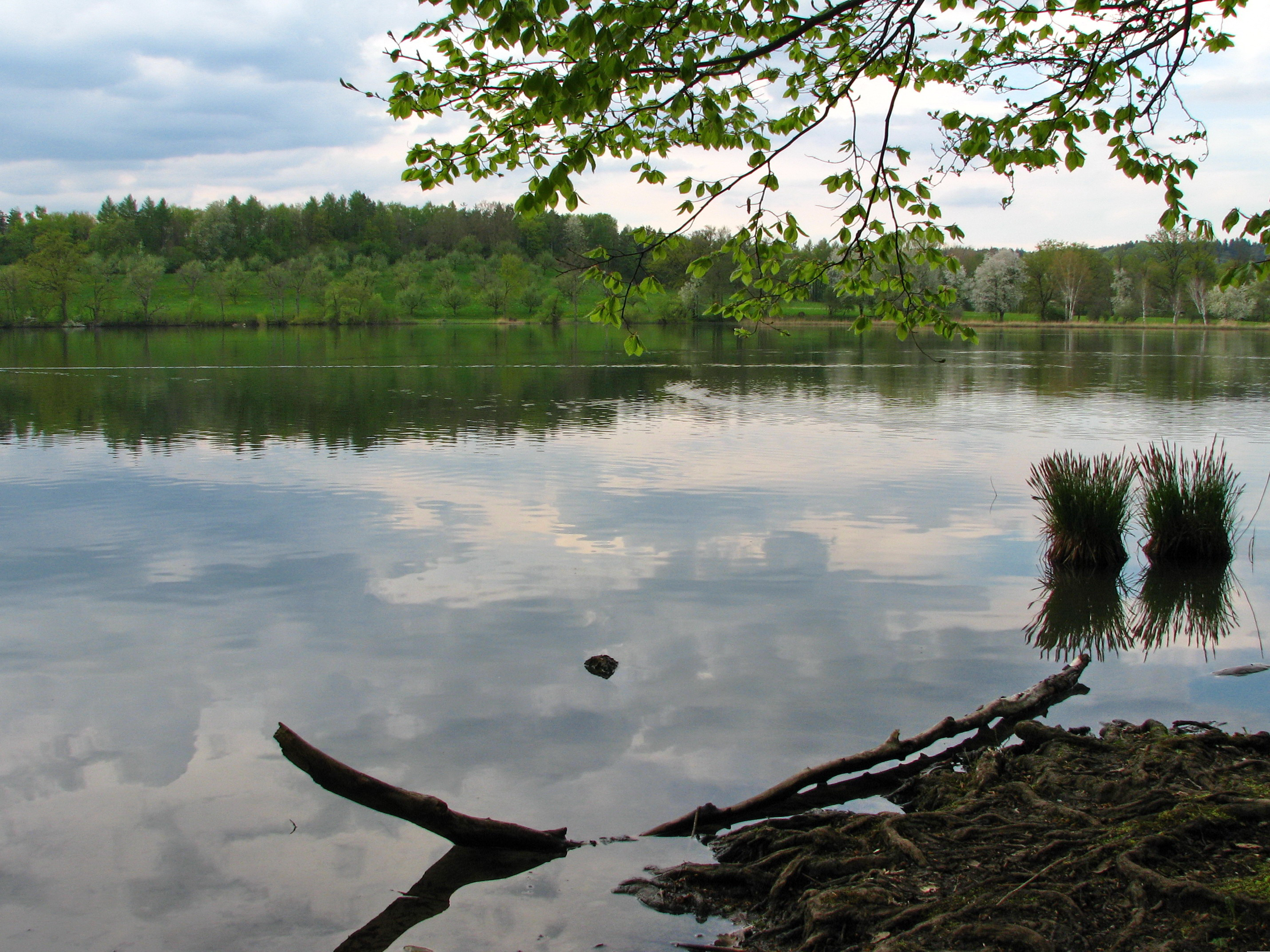
unterer (lower) Katzensee

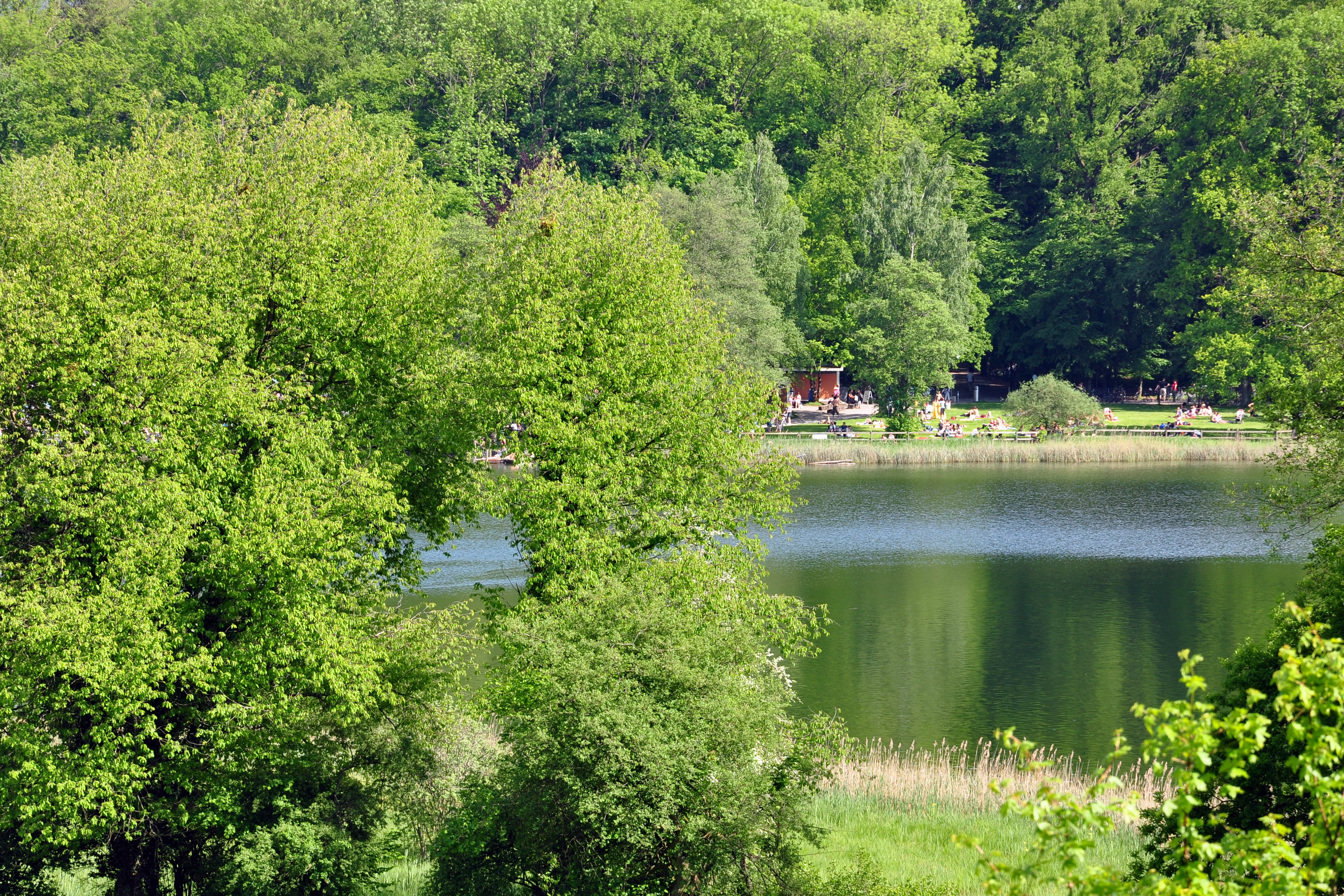
Strandbad Katzensee

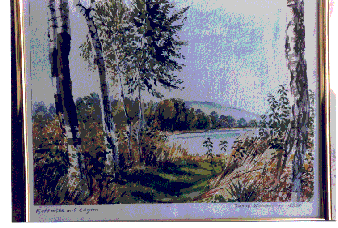
Watercolour picture of Katzensee by Jakob Weidmann (1930)
