= Seebad Katzensee =

Public bath in Switzerland

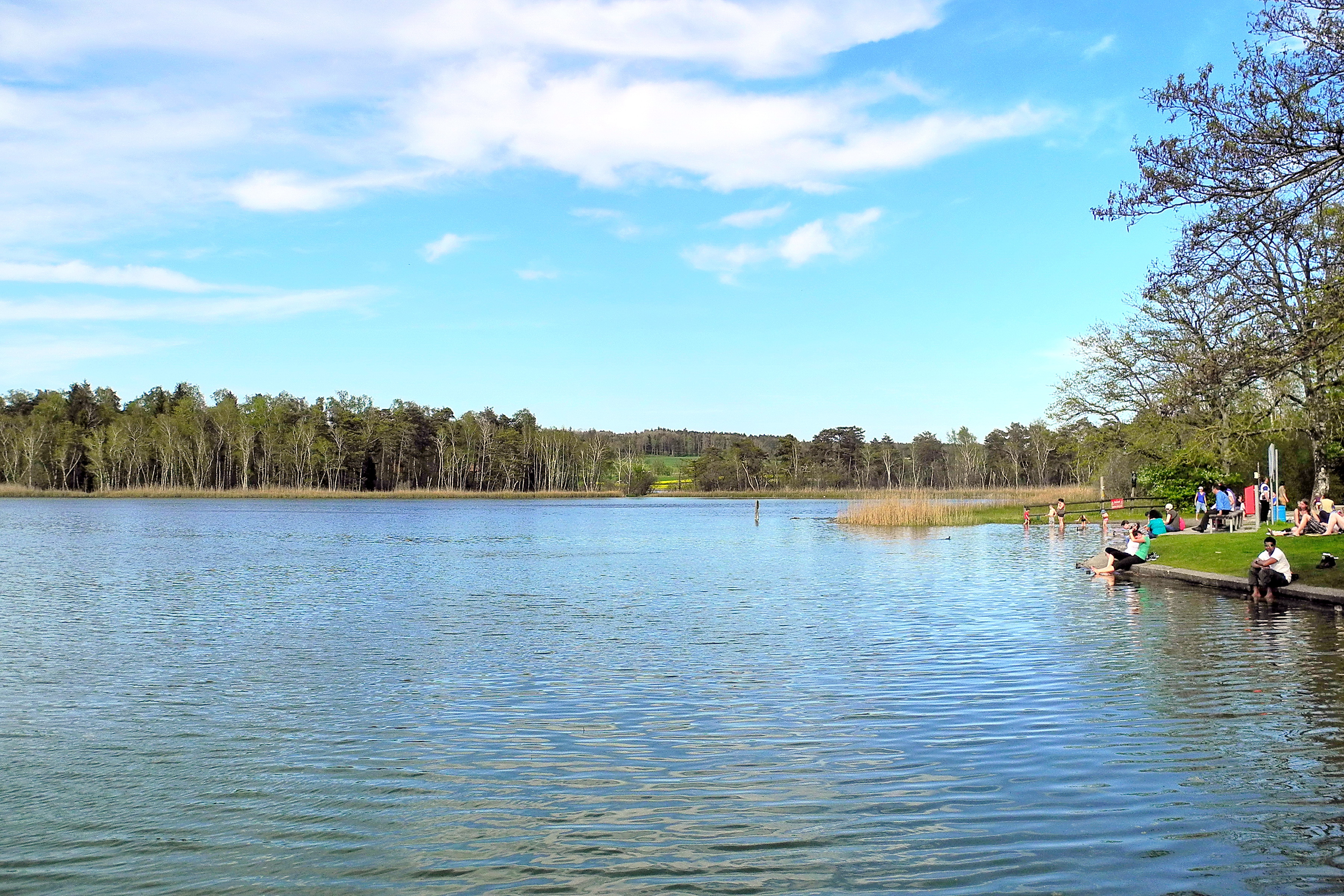
- Katzensee
- Interactive map of Seebad Katzensee
- Location: Katzenseestrasse, Zürich, CH-8046
- Coordinates: 47.431238°N 8.493173°E
- Operator: City of Zürich
- Type: public bath; lake bath
- Facilities: crèche, kiosk, playground
- Dimensions: Depth: 4 metres (13 ft)

Construction
- Opened: 1922

Website
- Official website (in German)

Seebad Katzensee (Strandbad is commonly used, while Seebad is the "official" name) is a public bath in the Swiss municipalities of Zürich-Affoltern and Regensdorf.

== Geography ==
The bath is situated at the Katzensee lake respectively protected area of that name in Zürich-Affoltern quarter at the boundary towards the suburban municipality of Regensdorf at the southern shore of the small lake. Public transport is provided by the VBZ transport company by the bus line 32 to Holzerhurd stop or bus line 61 to Mühlacker stop. as well as by the ZVV S-Bahn line S6 towards Affoltern train station.

== History and description ==
"Chatzesee" is the Swiss German name of the lake that is a remnant of the Linth glacier, in fact two small idyllic lakes which are connected by an artificial canal. The surrounding fens are the habitat for rare plant communities and a variety of animals, and are classified as a protected area; rubber boats and air mattresses are therefore not allowed. The bathhouse at the so-called lower lake interrupts the otherwise dense reed beds and allows the restricted public access to the water. Equipped with an appropriate infrastructure, lawns with shade trees, barbecue areas and a children's playground, the beach is very popular because the entrance is free.
