= District 7 (Zurich) =

Kreis 7 District of the city of Zurich
- District
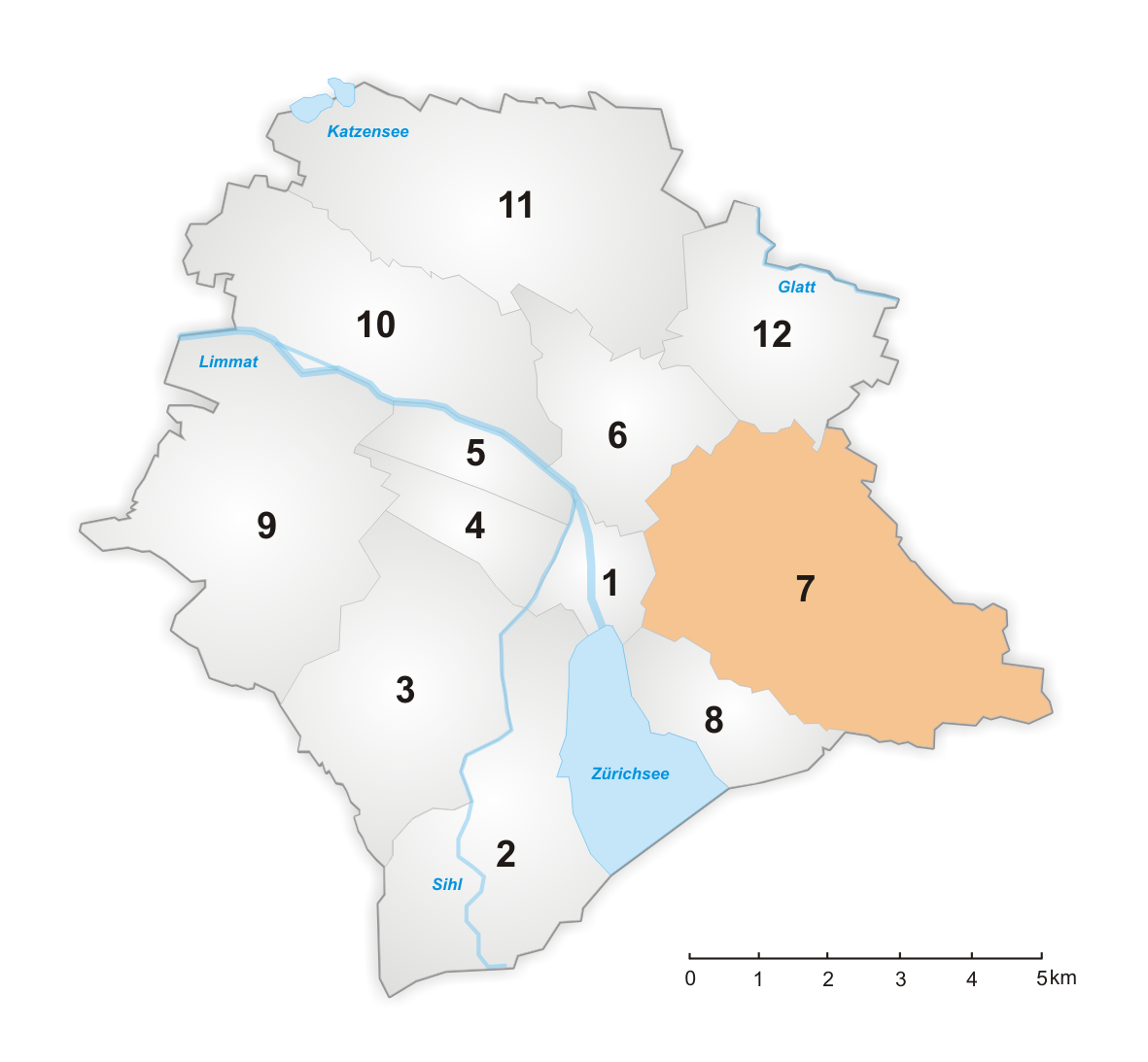
- Coordinates: 47.373°N 8.580°E
- Country: Switzerland
- Canton: Zurich
- City: Zurich

Area
  - Total: 15 km^{2} (5.8 sq mi)

Population (31. Dec. 2005)
  - Total: 34,148
  - Density: 2,274/km^{2} (5,890/sq mi)
- District Number: 7
- Quarters: Fluntern; Hottingen; Hirslanden; Witikon

District 7 (German: Kreis 7) is a district east of the old town in the Swiss city of Zurich.

The district comprises the quarters Fluntern, Hottingen, Hirslanden and Witikon. All entities were formerly municipalities of their own, but were incorporated into Zurich in 1893 (Witikon in 1934).

The district is known for being wealthy.
