= Zürich Zoologischer Garten =

Zoo in Zurich

Zoo Zurich
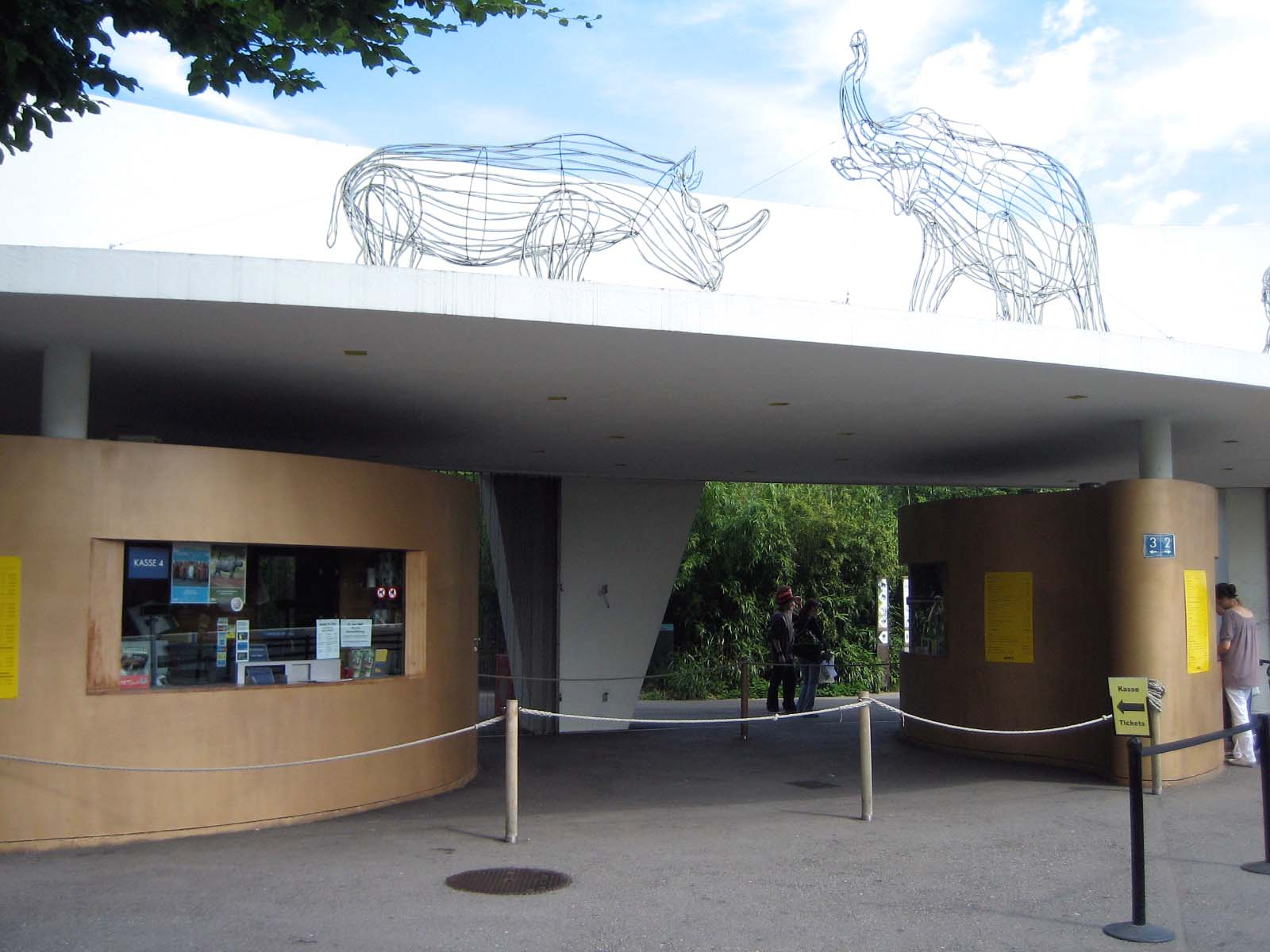
- Entrance
- Interactive map of Zoo Zurich
- 47°23′6″N 8°34′23″E
- Date opened: 1929
- Location: Zurich, Switzerland
- Land area: 27 ha / 0.1 sq mi
- No. of animals: 4673 (2016)
- No. of species: 375 (2016)
- Annual visitors: 1.2 Million (2016)
- Website: www.zoo.ch/en

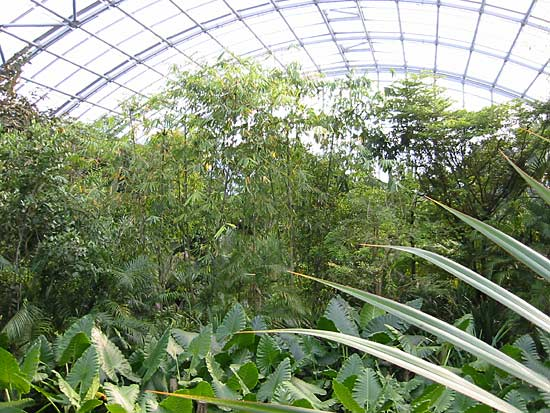
Interior of the Masoala Hall

The Zoo Zurich is a zoo located in Zurich, Switzerland. Opened in 1929, it is the third oldest zoo in Switzerland (after Basel and Arth-Goldau) and it accumulated a collection of 2,200 specimens of 300 species by its seventy-fifth year. It is located on Zürichbergstrasse, on the lower reaches of the Zürichberg in the Fluntern quarter.

The zoologist Heini Hediger was director of the Zurich Zoo from 1954 to 1973. The current director is Severin Dressen. The zoo is member of WAZA and the EAZA.

The most famous attractions are the Asian elephant exhibit and Masoala Hall, which are inside of a large dome. They are also known as the only and first European institution to successfully breed Galápagos tortoises. Over the course of the years, the Zurich attraction has sent the baby tortoises to more than two dozen other zoos. In 2005 the zoo discovered that the seven lemurs caught in Andasibe thought to be mouse lemurs were actually a new species later named Goodman mouse lemur.

The zoo made international headlines in July 2020 when a Siberian tiger mauled a zookeeper to death in front of members of the public.

== Masterplan ==
In 1992 a new plan for the development of the zoo was presented. The area of the zoo was to be doubled by 2020, while keeping the number of species the same and redoing most of the enclosures. The goal was to shift the focus away from displaying animals towards displaying ecosystems, allowing animals to retreat into spaces hidden from visitors. To house these ecosystems - Eurasia, South America and Africa/Madagascar - the zoo was geographically divided into distinct zones.

== See also ==
- Botanical Garden of the University of Zurich
- Natural History Museum of the University of Zurich
