= Fluntern =

Quarter of the city of Zurich, Switzerland

- Quarter
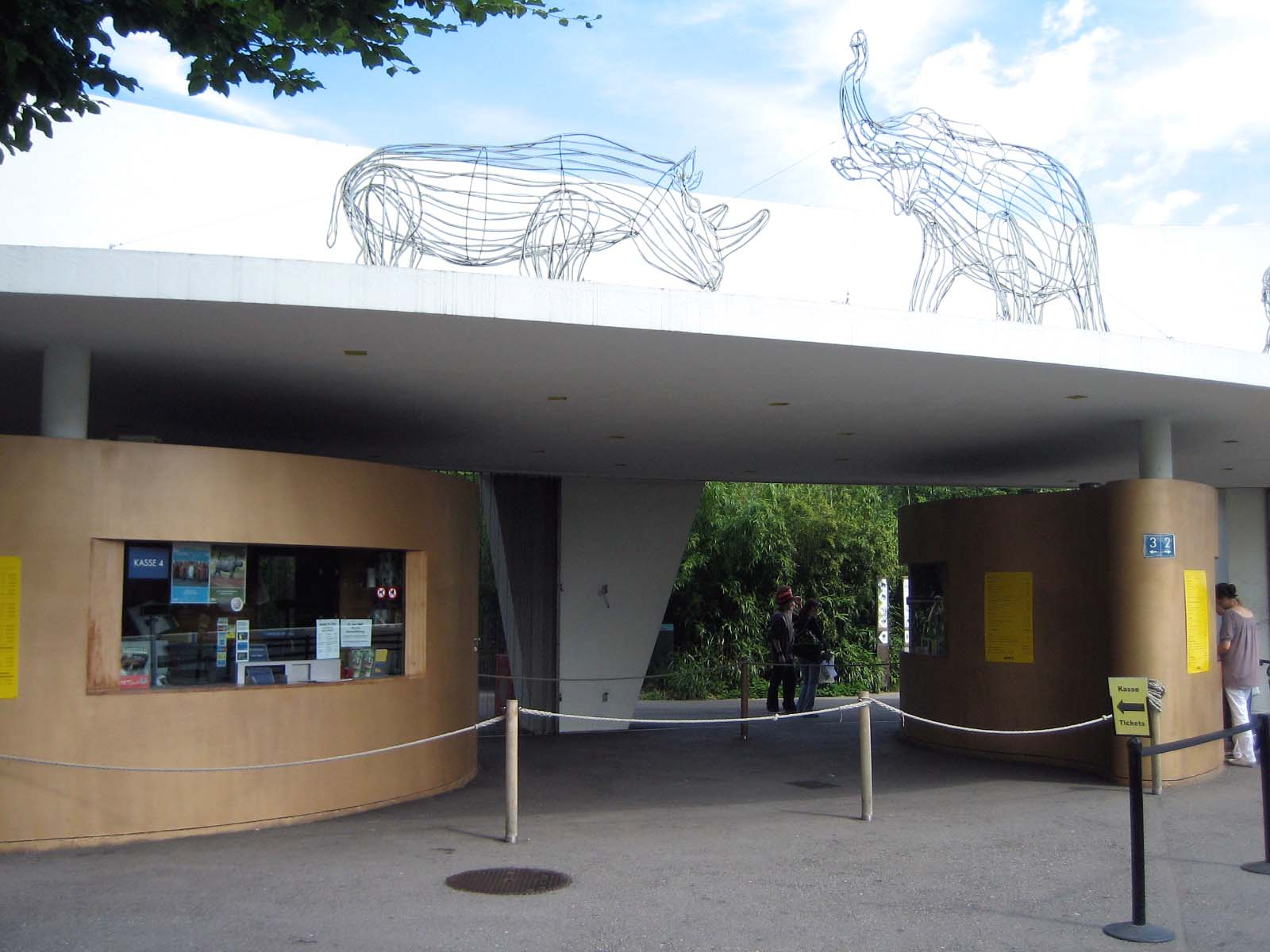
- The Zürich Zoo entrance

- Flag Coat of arms

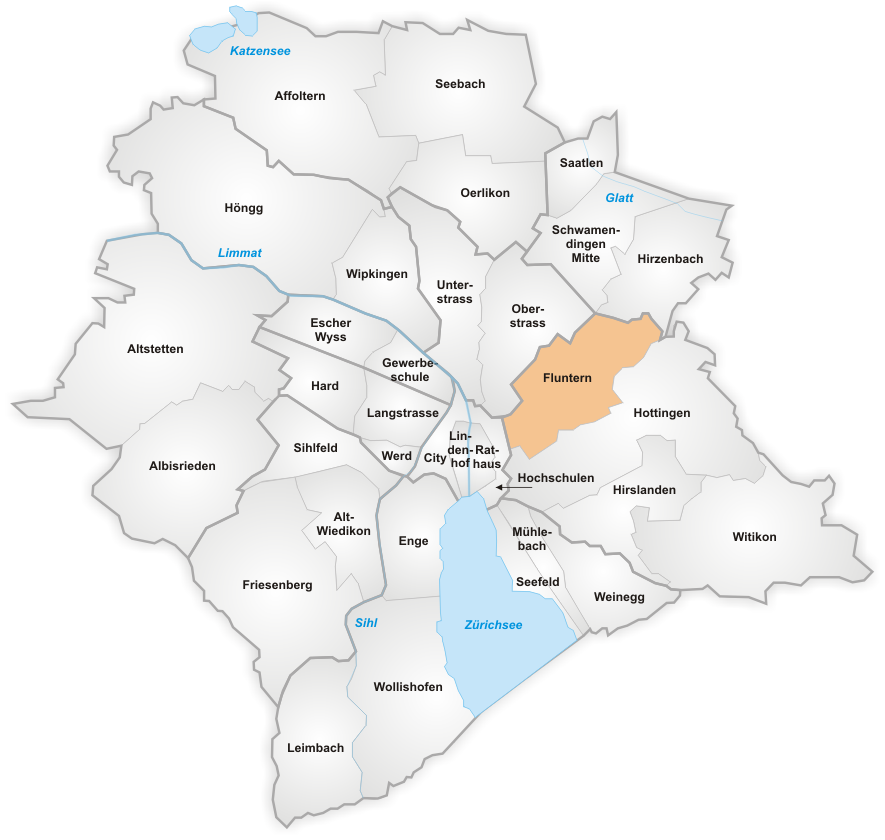
- The quarter of Fluntern in Zurich
- Coordinates: 47°22′51″N 8°33′47″E
- Country: Switzerland
- Canton: Zurich
- City: Zurich
- District: 7

Area
  - Total: 2.84 km^{2} (1.10 sq mi)
- Elevation: 556 m (1,824 ft)

Population
  - Total: 7,325
  - Density: 2,580/km^{2} (6,680/sq mi)

Fluntern is a quarter in the district 7 in Zürich, Switzerland. It was formerly a municipality of its own, having been incorporated into Zürich in 1893. The quarter has a population of 7,325 distributed on an area of 2.84 km^{2}.

== Notable features ==
The Zürich Zoologischer Garten, opened in 1929, is located in this quarter.

Built in 1901 as Rigiblick restaurant, the former Gastsaal was re-opened as Theater Rigiblick in 1984.

== Climate ==
Climate data for Zürich (Fluntern), elevation: 556 m or 1,824 ft, 1981–2010 normals, extremes 1901–present
Month	Jan	Feb	Mar	Apr	May	Jun	Jul	Aug	Sep	Oct	Nov	Dec	Year
Record high °C (°F)	16.9 (62.4)	19.3 (66.7)	23.2 (73.8)	31.3 (88.3)	32.4 (90.3)	36.4 (97.5)	37.7 (99.9)	36.2 (97.2)	32.5 (90.5)	28.7 (83.7)	23.8 (74.8)	17.0 (62.6)	37.7 (99.9)
Mean daily maximum °C (°F)	2.9 (37.2)	4.6 (40.3)	9.5 (49.1)	13.8 (56.8)	18.5 (65.3)	21.6 (70.9)	24.0 (75.2)	23.3 (73.9)	18.8 (65.8)	13.7 (56.7)	7.2 (45.0)	3.7 (38.7)	13.5 (56.3)
Daily mean °C (°F)	0.3 (32.5)	1.3 (34.3)	5.3 (41.5)	8.8 (47.8)	13.3 (55.9)	16.4 (61.5)	18.6 (65.5)	18.0 (64.4)	14.1 (57.4)	9.9 (49.8)	4.4 (39.9)	1.4 (34.5)	9.3 (48.7)
Mean daily minimum °C (°F)	−2.0 (28.4)	−1.6 (29.1)	1.7 (35.1)	4.5 (40.1)	8.8 (47.8)	11.9 (53.4)	14.0 (57.2)	13.8 (56.8)	10.5 (50.9)	7.0 (44.6)	2.0 (35.6)	−0.7 (30.7)	5.8 (42.4)
Record low °C (°F)	−20.8 (−5.4)	−24.2 (−11.6)	−14.4 (6.1)	−6.5 (20.3)	−2.0 (28.4)	0.9 (33.6)	5.3 (41.5)	4.0 (39.2)	−0.3 (31.5)	−5.5 (22.1)	−11.0 (12.2)	−18.5 (−1.3)	−24.2 (−11.6)
Average precipitation mm (inches)	63 (2.5)	64 (2.5)	78 (3.1)	83 (3.3)	122 (4.8)	128 (5.0)	124 (4.9)	124 (4.9)	99 (3.9)	86 (3.4)	79 (3.1)	83 (3.3)	1,134 (44.6)
Average snowfall cm (inches)	18.4 (7.2)	22.0 (8.7)	13.7 (5.4)	3.0 (1.2)	0.0 (0.0)	0.0 (0.0)	0.0 (0.0)	0.0 (0.0)	0.0 (0.0)	0.8 (0.3)	8.0 (3.1)	19.1 (7.5)	85.0 (33.5)
Average precipitation days (≥ 1.0 mm)	10.5	9.3	11.9	11.4	12.4	12.7	12.3	11.6	10.2	9.9	10.3	11.4	133.9
Average snowy days (≥ 1.0 cm)	4.8	5.2	3.2	0.7	0.0	0.0	0.0	0.0	0.0	0.1	1.6	4.8	20.4
Average relative humidity (%)	83	78	72	69	71	71	71	74	79	83	84	84	77
Mean monthly sunshine hours	55	81	124	153	175	189	215	200	150	102	59	42	1,544
Percentage possible sunshine	22	31	36	40	41	44	49	50	44	33	24	18	38
Source 1: MeteoSwiss
Source 2: KNMI

Climate data for Zürich (Fluntern), elevation: 556 m (1,824 ft), 1961-1990 normals and extremes
Month	Jan	Feb	Mar	Apr	May	Jun	Jul	Aug	Sep	Oct	Nov	Dec	Year
Record high °C (°F)	14.3 (57.7)	16.4 (61.5)	21.5 (70.7)	26.2 (79.2)	29.7 (85.5)	30.8 (87.4)	35.8 (96.4)	32.3 (90.1)	28.3 (82.9)	26.7 (80.1)	22.8 (73.0)	16.5 (61.7)	35.8 (96.4)
Mean maximum °C (°F)	9.8 (49.6)	11.0 (51.8)	16.2 (61.2)	21.5 (70.7)	25.1 (77.2)	27.9 (82.2)	29.8 (85.6)	28.9 (84.0)	24.7 (76.5)	20.4 (68.7)	15.9 (60.6)	10.7 (51.3)	29.8 (85.6)
Mean daily maximum °C (°F)	2.0 (35.6)	3.7 (38.7)	7.9 (46.2)	12.4 (54.3)	16.8 (62.2)	20.0 (68.0)	22.4 (72.3)	21.3 (70.3)	18.0 (64.4)	12.6 (54.7)	6.8 (44.2)	3.1 (37.6)	12.3 (54.0)
Daily mean °C (°F)	−0.6 (30.9)	0.7 (33.3)	4.1 (39.4)	8.0 (46.4)	12.2 (54.0)	15.5 (59.9)	17.6 (63.7)	16.7 (62.1)	13.9 (57.0)	9.1 (48.4)	4.0 (39.2)	0.6 (33.1)	8.5 (47.3)
Mean daily minimum °C (°F)	−2.8 (27.0)	−1.7 (28.9)	0.7 (33.3)	3.7 (38.7)	7.6 (45.7)	10.8 (51.4)	12.5 (54.5)	12.0 (53.6)	9.8 (49.6)	5.9 (42.6)	1.6 (34.9)	−1.4 (29.5)	4.9 (40.8)
Mean minimum °C (°F)	−10.1 (13.8)	−8.1 (17.4)	−5.5 (22.1)	−1.5 (29.3)	2.1 (35.8)	5.7 (42.3)	7.8 (46.0)	7.5 (45.5)	4.8 (40.6)	0.4 (32.7)	−4.3 (24.3)	−8.4 (16.9)	−10.1 (13.8)
Record low °C (°F)	−20.8 (−5.4)	−16.6 (2.1)	−14.6 (5.7)	−4.1 (24.6)	−1.8 (28.8)	1.0 (33.8)	5.1 (41.2)	4.6 (40.3)	1.3 (34.3)	−1.7 (28.9)	−10.3 (13.5)	−14.7 (5.5)	−20.8 (−5.4)
Average precipitation mm (inches)	69.0 (2.72)	70.0 (2.76)	70.0 (2.76)	89.0 (3.50)	105.0 (4.13)	125.0 (4.92)	118.0 (4.65)	135.0 (5.31)	94.0 (3.70)	69.0 (2.72)	82.0 (3.23)	75.0 (2.95)	1,101 (43.35)
Average precipitation days (≥ 1.0 mm)	11.0	10.0	12.0	12.0	13.0	13.0	12.0	12.0	9.0	8.0	11.0	11.0	134
Average relative humidity (%)	85.0	80.0	75.0	72.0	73.0	74.0	73.0	77.0	81.0	84.0	84.0	85.0	78.6
Mean monthly sunshine hours	42.4	76.2	118.0	139.5	166.1	178.3	210.7	191.9	158.1	104.6	58.2	38.0	1,482
Source: NOAA

Aerial view (1947)
