= Hirslanden =

Quarter of the city of Zurich, Switzerland

- Quarter
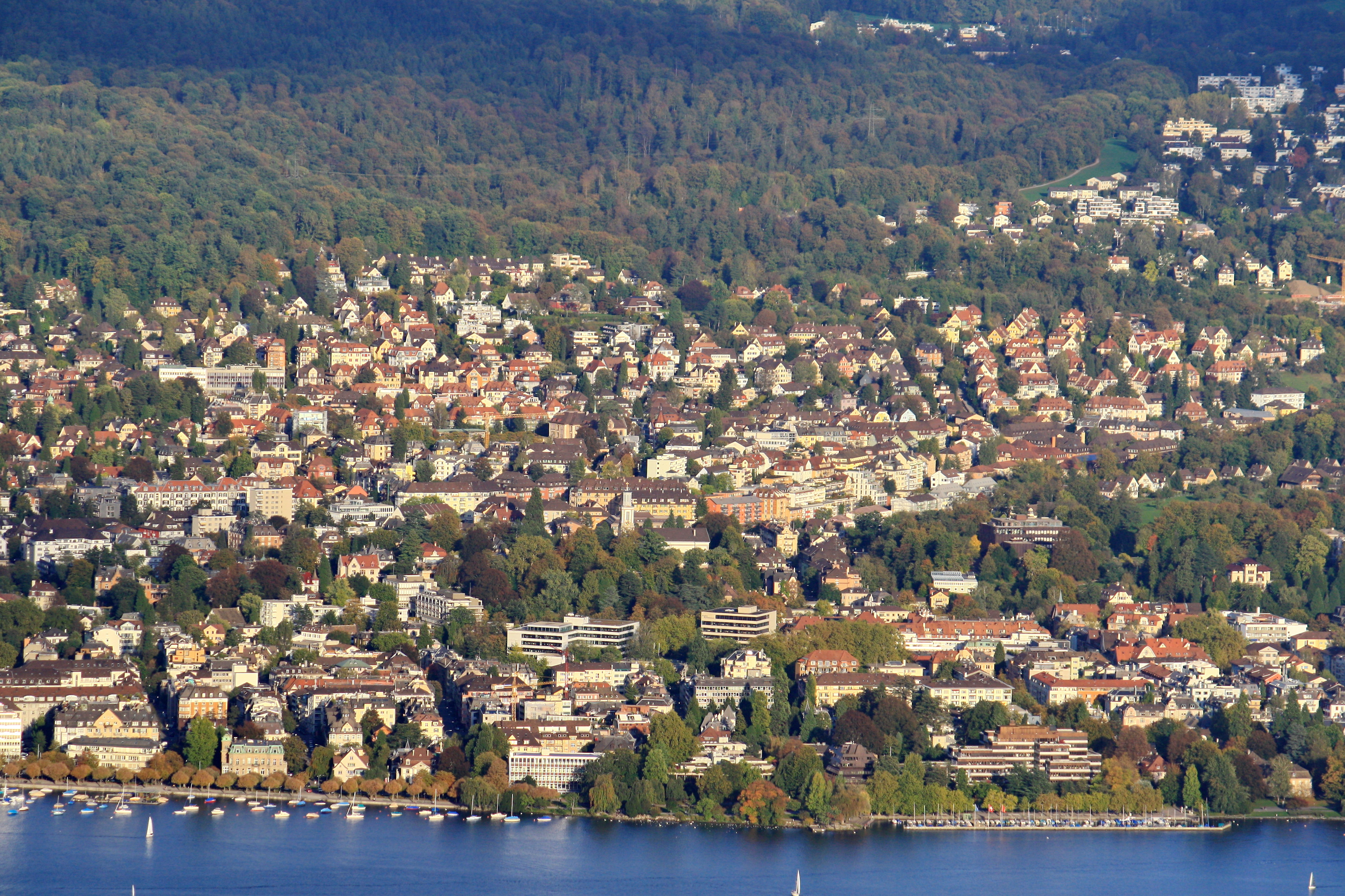
- Adlisberg and Hirslanden, as seen from Uetliberg, Seefeld quarter in the foreground (October 2009)

- Flag Coat of arms

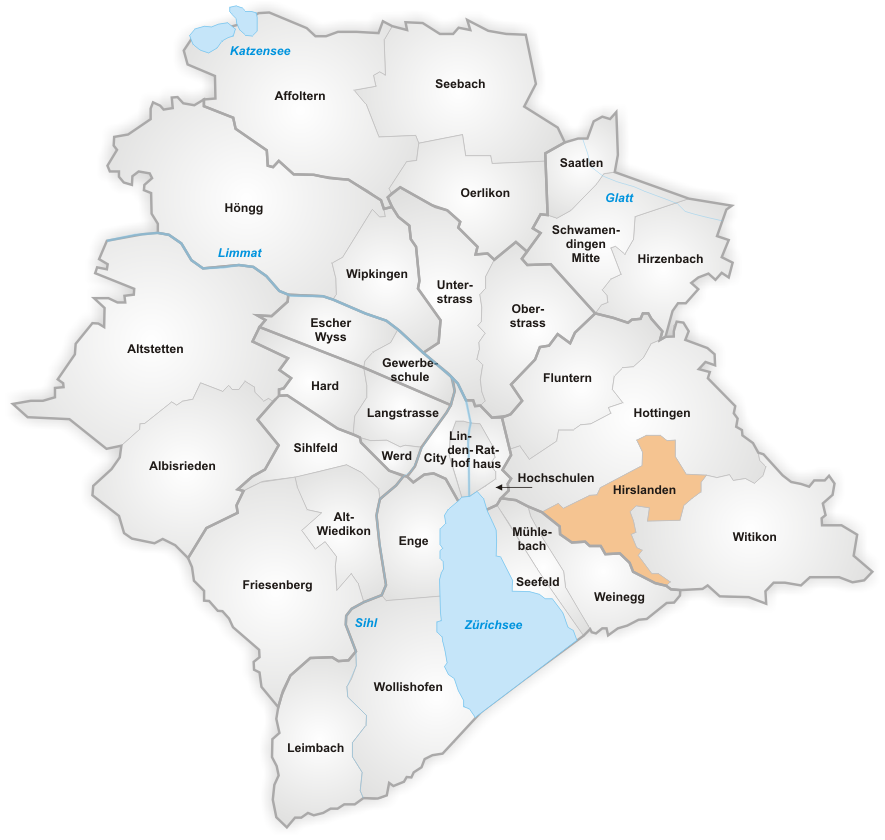
- The quarter of Hirslanden in Zurich
- Coordinates: 47°21′49″N 8°34′16″E
- Country: Switzerland
- Canton: Zurich
- City: Zurich
- District: 7

Hirslanden is a quarter in the district 7 in Zürich.

It was formerly a municipality of its own, having been incorporated into Zürich in 1893.

As of 2025, the quarter has a population of 7,648 distributed on an area of 2.187 km^{2} (0.844 sq mi).

Hirslanden is located on the western side of the Adlisberg.

Aerial view (1953)
