= District 11 (Zurich) =

Kreis 11 District of the city of Zurich
- District
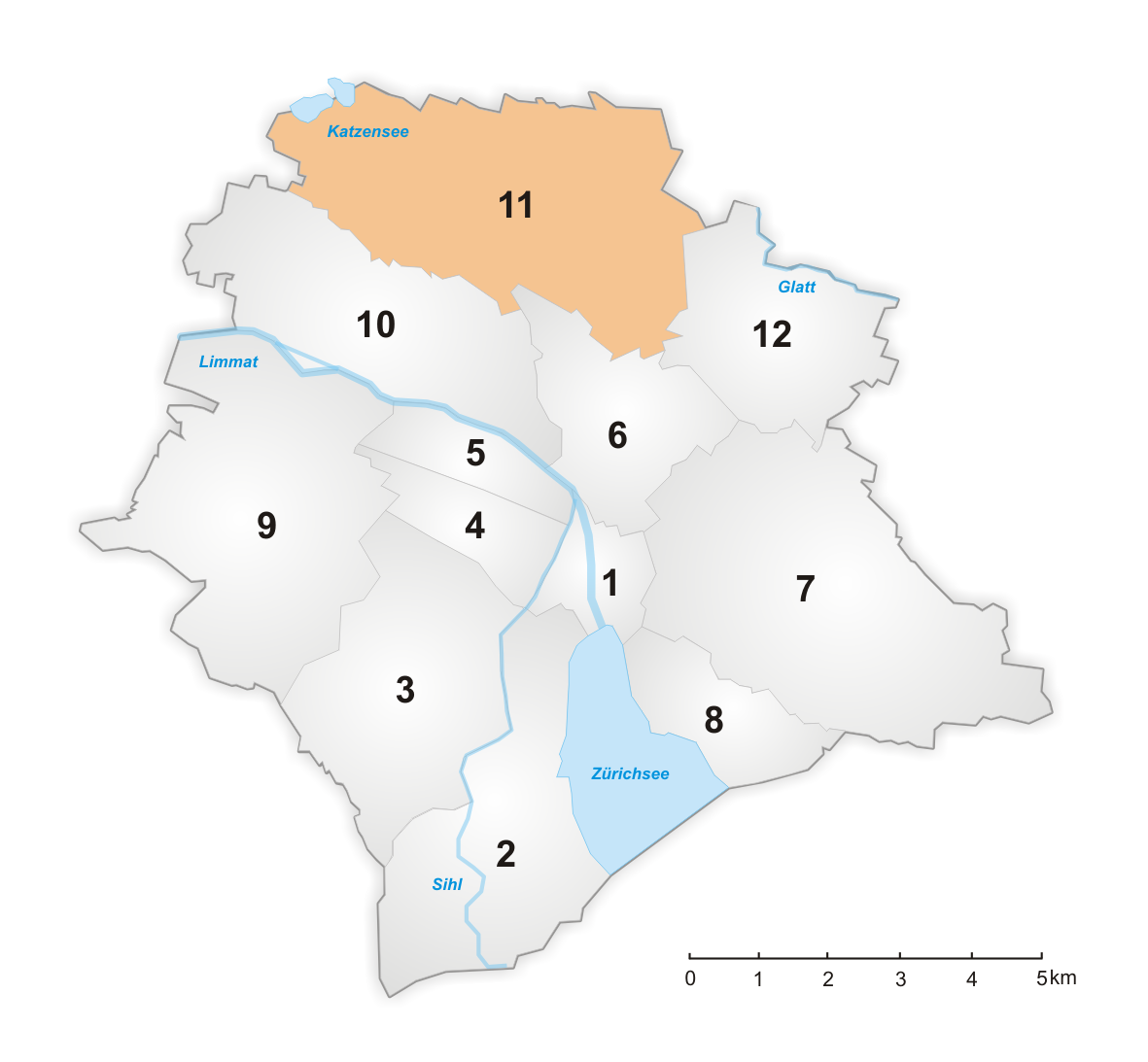
- Coordinates: 47.423°N 8.521°E
- Country: Switzerland
- Canton: Zurich
- City: Zurich

Area
  - Total: 13.4 km^{2} (5.2 sq mi)

Population (31. Mar. 2012)
  - Total: 68,239
  - Density: 5,085/km^{2} (13,170/sq mi)
- District Number: 11
- Quarters: Affoltern; Oerlikon; Seebach

District 11 is the most northern and the most populous district in the Swiss city of Zurich.

The district comprises the quarters Affoltern, Oerlikon and Seebach. All three were formerly municipalities in their own right, but were incorporated into Zurich in 1934.
