= Arthur Honegger (journalist) =

Swiss writer and journalist (1924–2017)

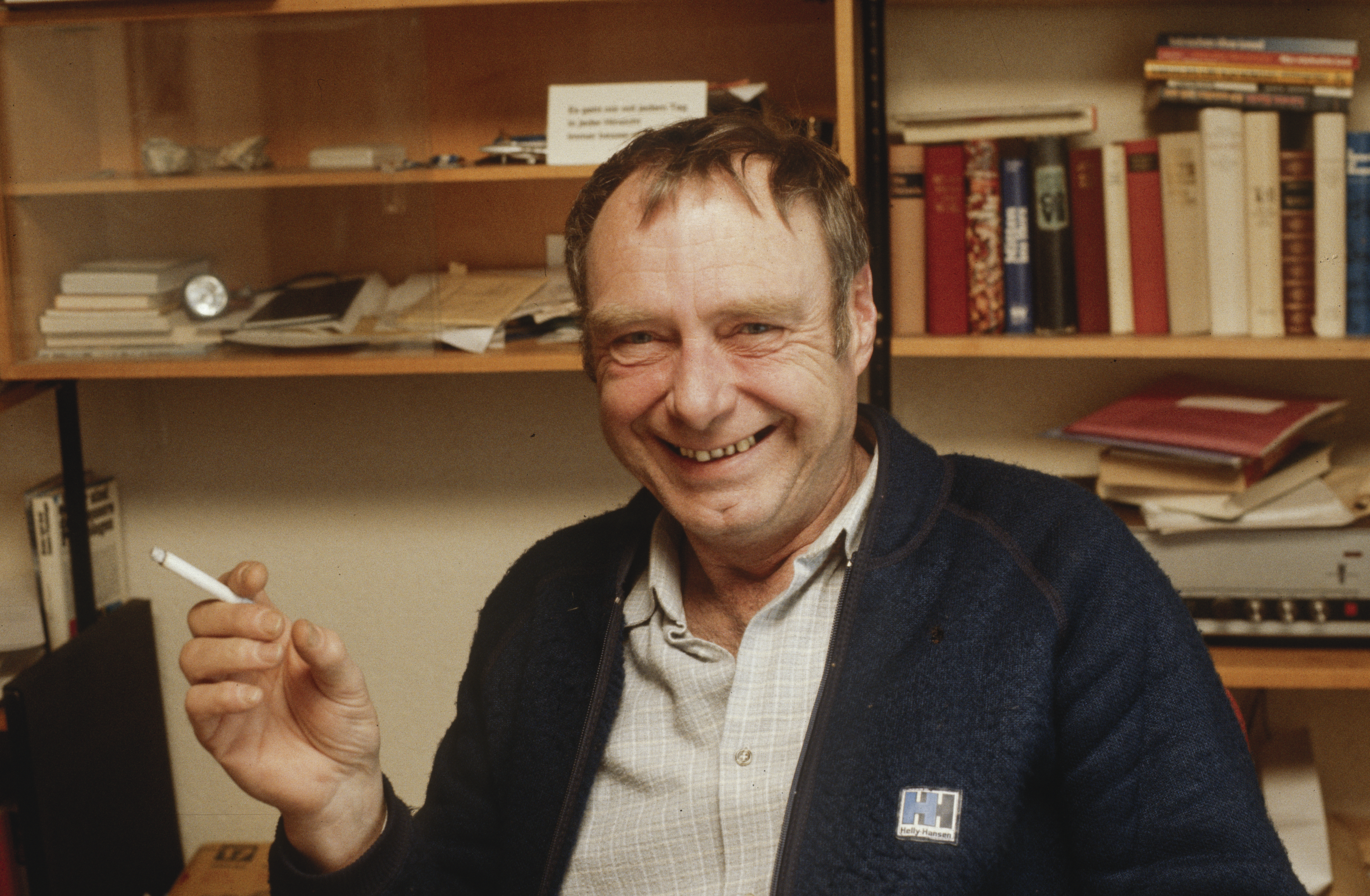
- Born: Arthur Honegger; September 27, 1924; St. Gallen, Switzerland
- Died: August 15, 2017 (aged 92); Nesslau, Switzerland
- Other name: Turi
- Occupations: Writer, journalist, politician
- Known for: Literature on Verdingkinder (contract children)
- Political party: Social Democratic Party of Switzerland (SP)
- Spouse: Heidi Vogelbach (m. 1949)
- Parent: Elsa Klara Honegger (mother)

Arthur Honegger (27 September 1924 – 15 August 2017) was a Swiss writer, journalist, and politician who became known for his literary works addressing the experiences of Verdingkinder (contract children) and social injustices in 20th-century Switzerland. Born as an illegitimate child and subjected to the Swiss child welfare system, Honegger drew on his personal experiences to write novels and reportages that shed light on the treatment of disadvantaged children and workers in Switzerland.

== Early life and institutionalization ==
Arthur Honegger was born on 27 September 1924 in St. Gallen as the illegitimate son of Elsa Klara Honegger. He was a citizen of Dürnten. As an illegitimate child, Honegger grew up with foster parents in Tann in the municipality of Dürnten, part of the systematic practice of child removal common in Switzerland at the time. At the age of 14, he was placed in the Pestalozzi home in Schlieren, and later sent to work for a farmer under the Verdingkinder system, where he was poorly treated.

In 1941, without justification, Honegger was committed to the Massnahmenzentrum Uitikon (cantonal reformatory), where he remained until reaching the age of majority in 1944. Even after his release, the adjutant and welfare officer of the institution continued to make his life difficult for years. However, Honegger managed to escape the predetermined escalation of further institutionalizations and deprivation of liberty through his tenacious sense of justice, creativity, and the stability provided by his relationship with his future wife.

== Career and political involvement ==
After his release from the reformatory, Honegger worked as a farm hand and waiter. From 1960 to 1962, he served as secretary of the Social Democratic Party of Switzerland (SP) in the canton of Thurgau. He subsequently worked as a journalist, including as a columnist under the pseudonym "Turi" for the newspaper Blick, and as a freelance writer specializing in German-language literature. From 1991 to 2000, Honegger represented the SP in the Cantonal Council of St. Gallen.

== Literary works ==
Honegger's novels depicted the world of Verdingkinder and the experiences of farmers and workers in Switzerland during the 1930s and 1940s. His major works include Die Fertigmacher (The Finishers, 1974) and Bernies Welt (Bernie's World, 1996), which focused on the experiences of contract children. Other significant works included Freitag oder Die Angst vor dem Zahltag (Friday or The Fear of Payday, 1976) and Wenn sie morgen kommen (When They Come Tomorrow, 1977), which portrayed the lives of farmers and workers during the interwar period and World War II.

== Awards and recognition ==
Honegger received several literary awards throughout his career. In 1974, he was awarded the Recognition Prize of the City of Zürich. In 1976, he received the Prize of the Swiss Schiller Foundation. The Cultural Foundation of the canton of St. Gallen honored him with its Recognition Prize in 1999, and in 2015, he was awarded the Anna Göldi Human Rights Prize.

== Personal life ==
In 1949, Honegger married Heidi Vogelbach, daughter of Otto Vogelbach. He was of the Reformed faith and remained active in literature and politics until late in life.

== Bibliography ==
=== Works by Arthur Honegger ===
- Honegger, Arthur: Die Fertigmacher, 1974 (expanded edition with catalogue of works 2004).
- Wohlwend, Lotty; Honegger, Arthur: Gestohlene Seelen. Verdingkinder in der Schweiz, 2004.
- Honegger, Arthur: Götti, 2006.
- Honegger, Arthur: Der rote Huber. Reportagen, 2007.
- Honegger, Arthur: Bedrohliche Tage, 2009.
- Honegger, Arthur: Wovon ich rede. Gegen alle Widerstände. Ein autobiografisches Protokoll, 2012.

=== Literature about Arthur Honegger ===
- Weder, Bruno H.: "Arthur Honegger", in: Kritisches Lexikon zur deutschsprachigen Gegenwartsliteratur, Vol. 6, 2002.
- "Wenn ich kann, schreibe ich gegen das Unrecht an". Arthur Honegger im Gespräch mit Charles Linsmayer", in: Honegger, Arthur: Die Fertigmacher, 2004, pp. 235–340.
- Wohlwend, Lotty: Turi. Ein Film über Arthur Honegger. Das Dokument eines Mannes. Das Schicksal einer Generation, 2004 (Film).
