= Affoltern (Zurich) =

Quarter of the city of Zurich, Switzerland

- Quarter
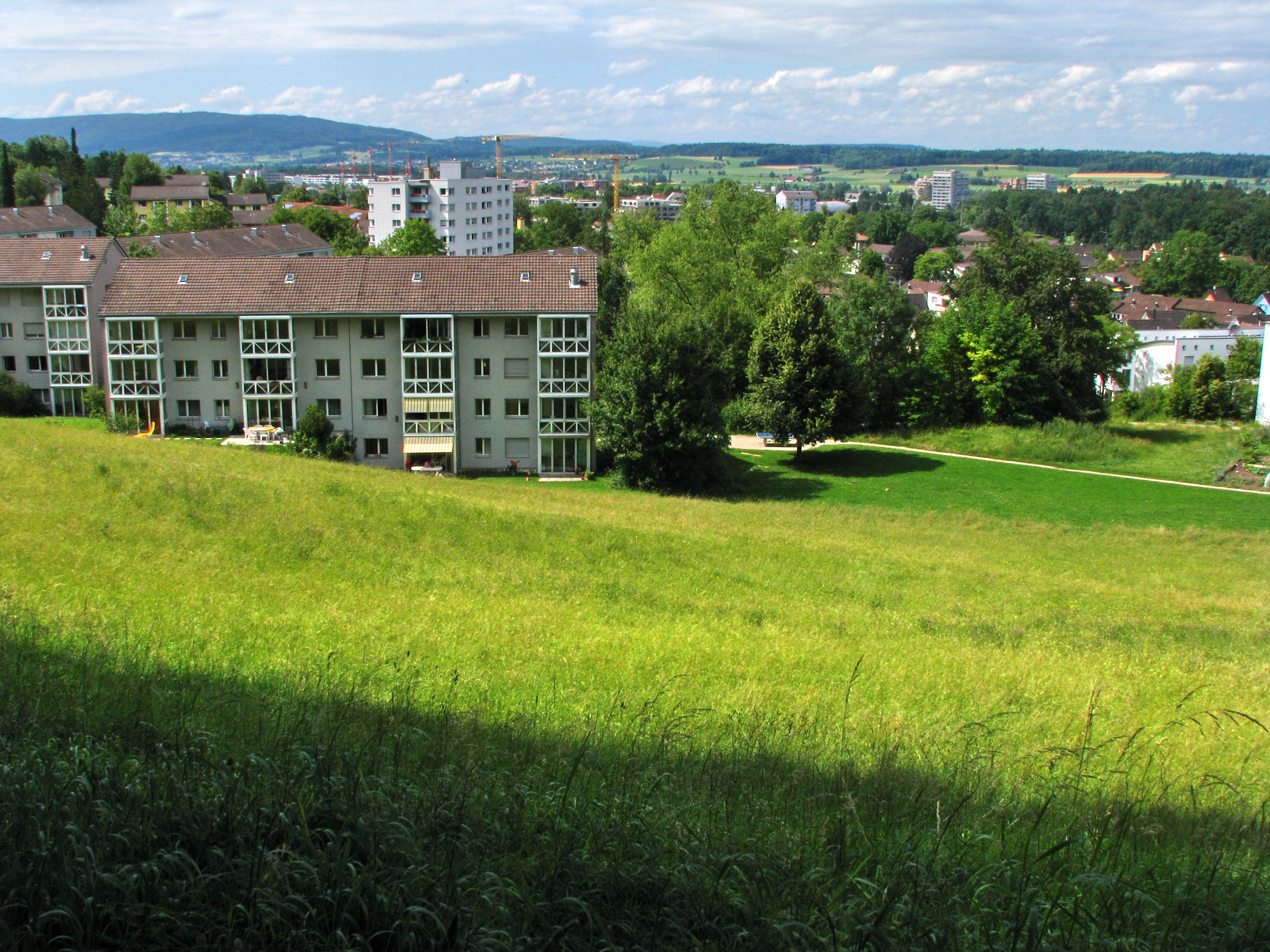
- Affoltern as seen from Käferberg

- Flag Coat of arms

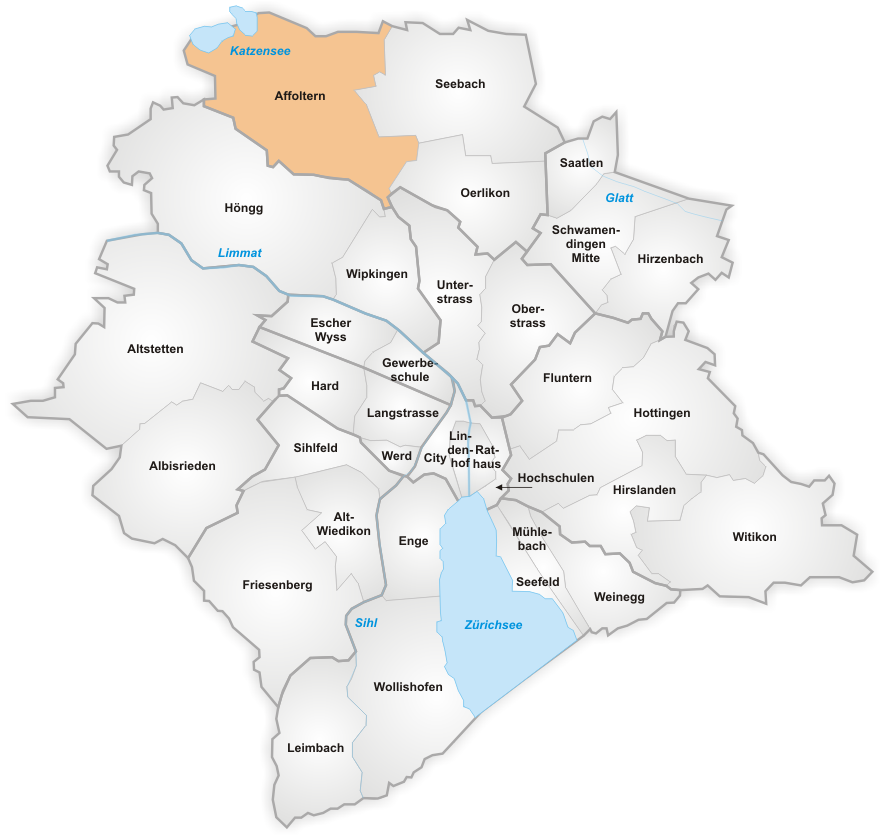
- The quarter of Affoltern in Zurich
- Coordinates: 47°25′14″N 8°30′10″E
- Country: Switzerland
- Canton: Zurich
- City: Zurich
- District: 11

Affoltern (Swiss Standard German pronunciation: [ˈafɔltərn]) is a quarter in district 11 in Zurich, located in the Glatt Valley (German: Glattal).

== History and demographics ==
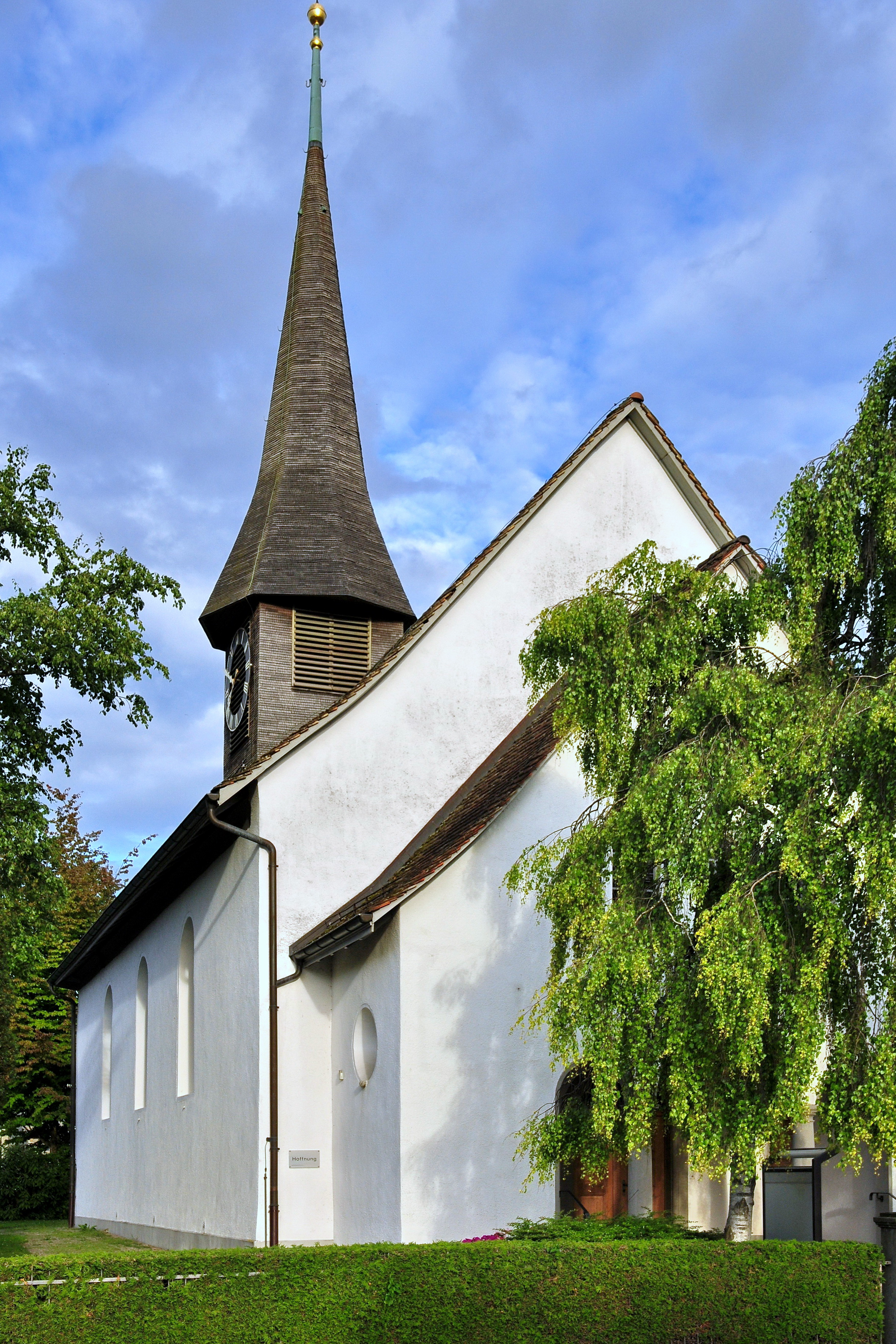
Reformed church in Unteraffoltern

Aerial view (1959)

Affoltern was first mentioned in 870 as Affaltrahe, and in the 9th century it was ruled by the St. Gallen Abbey, in the 12th/13th century by the House of Regensberg who built their ancestral seat Altburg nearby, followed in 1468 by the city of Zurich as part of the Obervogtei Regensberg ending in 1798. Affoltern was then after a municipality of its own, having been incorporated into the city of Zurich in 1934. As today, Affoltern consists of the former settlements (Fraktionen) Ober- und Unter-Affoltern.

The quarter has a population of 22'972 (2010) distributed on an area of 6.04 km^{2}, and is separated by the Käferberg from the inner city.

== Culture ==
The bath/lido Strandbad Katzensee is very popular.

== Transportation ==
Zürich Affoltern railway station is a stop of the Zurich S-Bahn on the S6 line.

== Climate ==
Climate data for Zurich / Affoltern (1991–2020)
Month	Jan	Feb	Mar	Apr	May	Jun	Jul	Aug	Sep	Oct	Nov	Dec	Year
Mean daily maximum °C (°F)	3.8 (38.8)	5.7 (42.3)	10.8 (51.4)	15.3 (59.5)	19.4 (66.9)	23.1 (73.6)	25.1 (77.2)	24.7 (76.5)	19.8 (67.6)	14.3 (57.7)	8.0 (46.4)	4.3 (39.7)	14.5 (58.1)
Daily mean °C (°F)	1.0 (33.8)	1.6 (34.9)	5.7 (42.3)	9.6 (49.3)	13.8 (56.8)	17.5 (63.5)	19.2 (66.6)	18.7 (65.7)	14.4 (57.9)	9.9 (49.8)	4.8 (40.6)	1.7 (35.1)	9.8 (49.6)
Mean daily minimum °C (°F)	−1.9 (28.6)	−2.2 (28.0)	0.8 (33.4)	3.9 (39.0)	8.3 (46.9)	11.9 (53.4)	13.6 (56.5)	13.4 (56.1)	9.7 (49.5)	6.1 (43.0)	1.8 (35.2)	−1.0 (30.2)	5.4 (41.7)
Average precipitation mm (inches)	63 (2.5)	55 (2.2)	65 (2.6)	73 (2.9)	115 (4.5)	112 (4.4)	116 (4.6)	109 (4.3)	79 (3.1)	80 (3.1)	74 (2.9)	80 (3.1)	1,022 (40.2)
Average precipitation days (≥ 1.0 mm)	9.8	8.6	10.1	10.0	11.9	11.5	11.3	11.2	9.3	10.4	9.9	11.2	125.2
Average relative humidity (%)	84	79	73	69	72	72	72	75	80	85	86	85	78
Mean monthly sunshine hours	51	81	139	178	195	216	237	219	159	95	51	40	1,662
Percentage possible sunshine	21	32	42	46	44	49	53	53	46	32	21	18	41
Source: MeteoSwiss
