= Witikon =

Quarter of the city of Zurich, Switzerland

Coordinates: 47°22′N 8°35′E

- Quarter
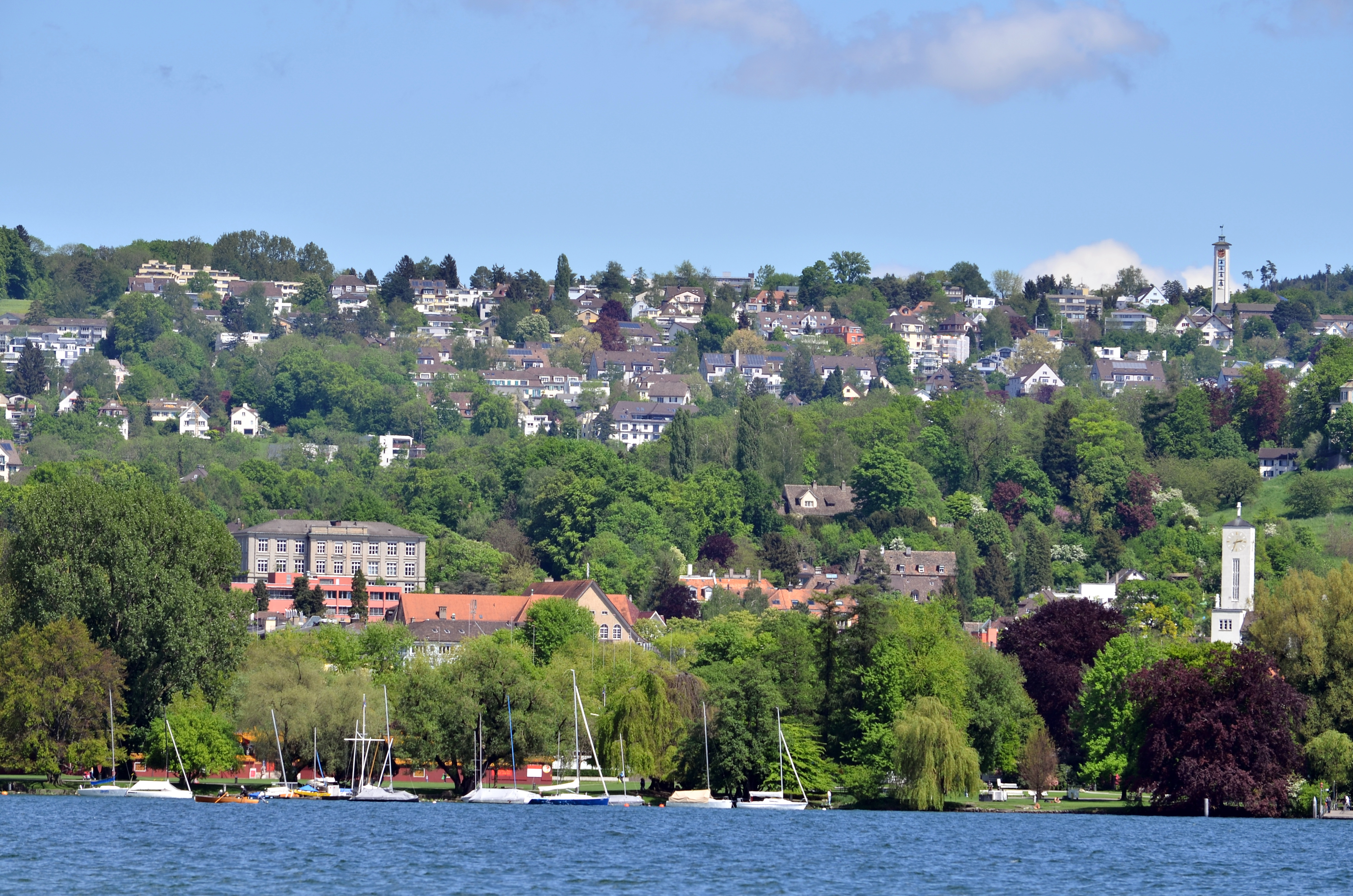
- Witikon and Zürichhorn in the foreground, as seen from Wollishofen (May 2015)

- Flag Coat of arms

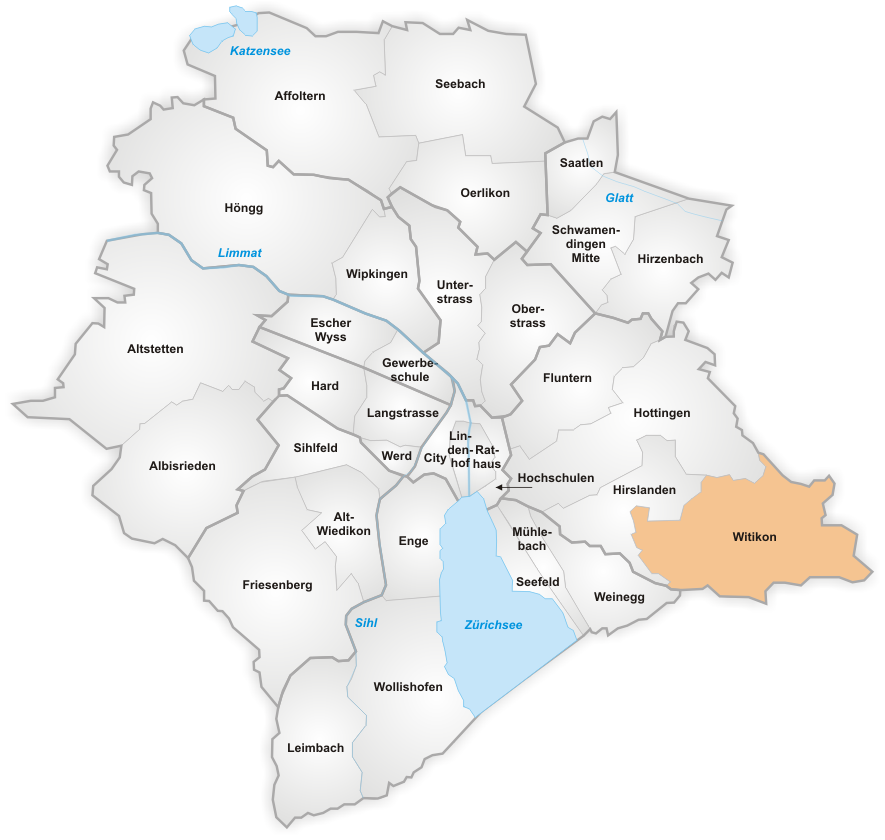
- The quarter of Witikon in Zurich
- Country: Switzerland
- Canton: Zurich
- City: Zurich
- District: 7

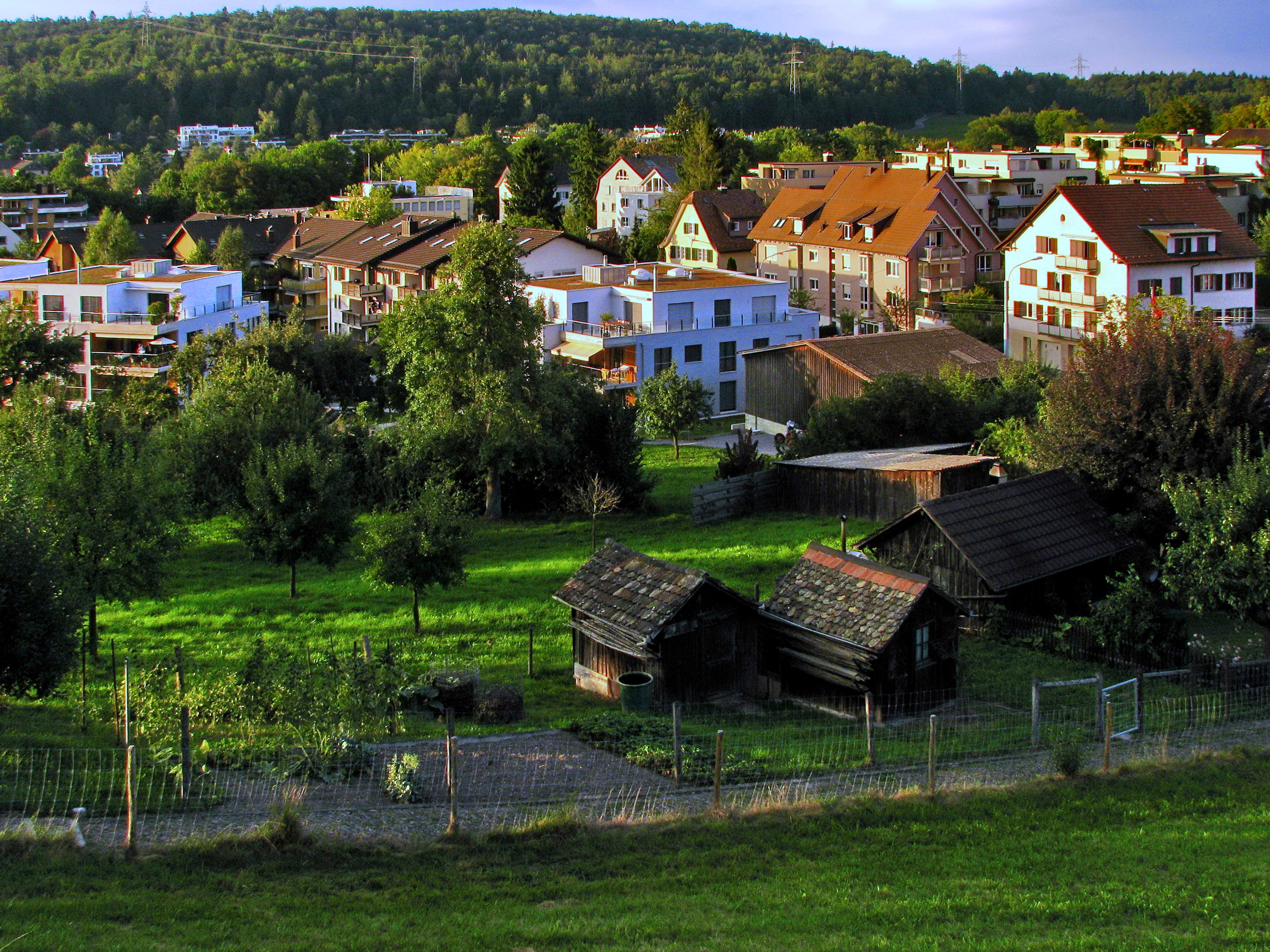
Witikon as seen from Alte Kirche Witikon (August 2009)

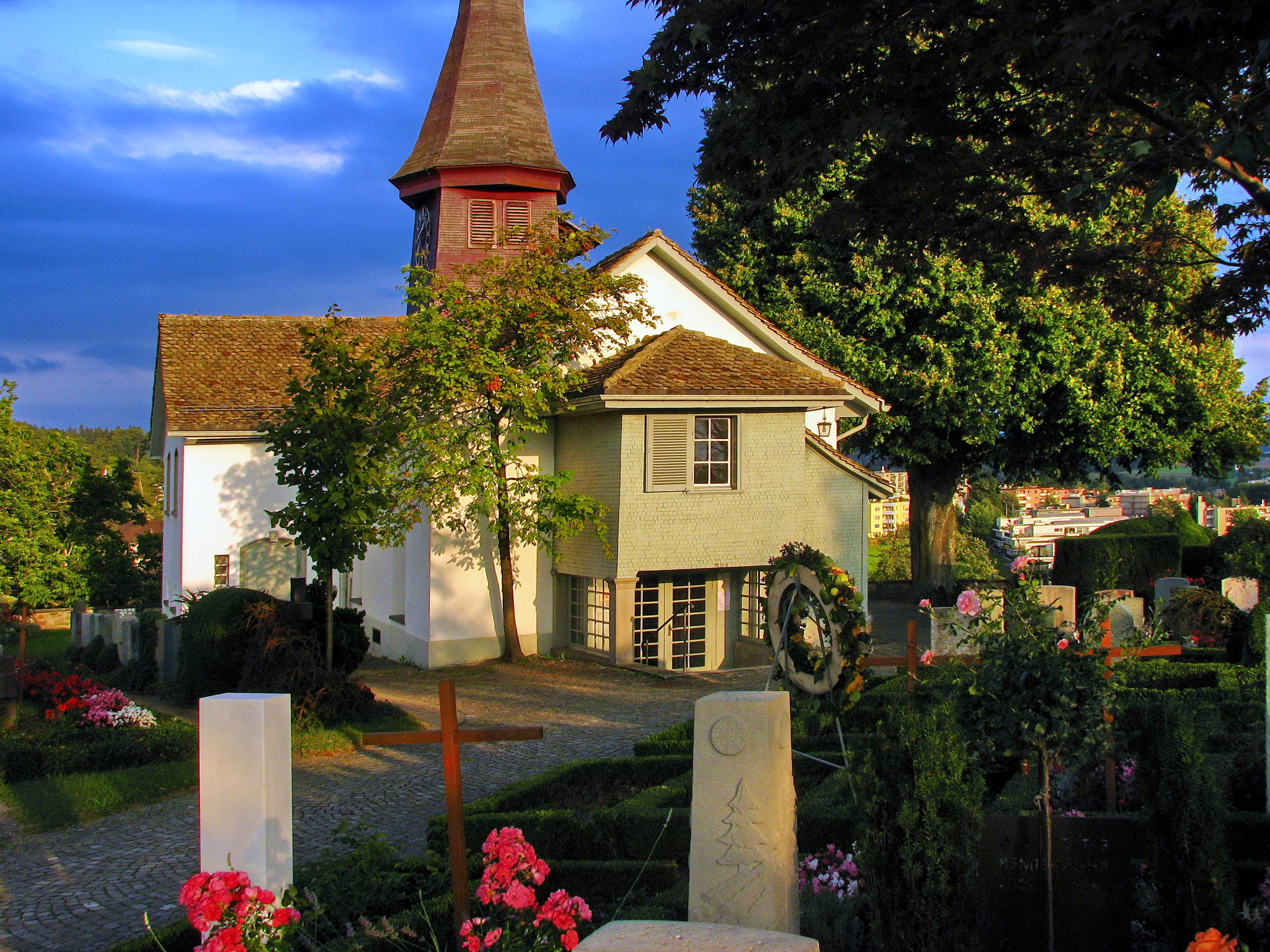
Alte Kirche (old church) and the small hilltop cemetery (August 2009)

Witikon is a quarter in the district 7 in Zürich.

It was formerly a municipality of its own, having been incorporated into Zürich in 1934.

As of 2025, the quarter has a population of 11,747 distributed on an area of 4.93 km^{2} (1.90 sq mi).

Witikon is located between the southwestern flank of the Adlisberg and the western flank of the Öschbrig.

Aerial view (1949)
