= Saatlen =

Quarter of the city of Zurich, Switzerland

Coordinates: 47°24′36.69″N 8°33′50.69″E

- Quarter of Zurich
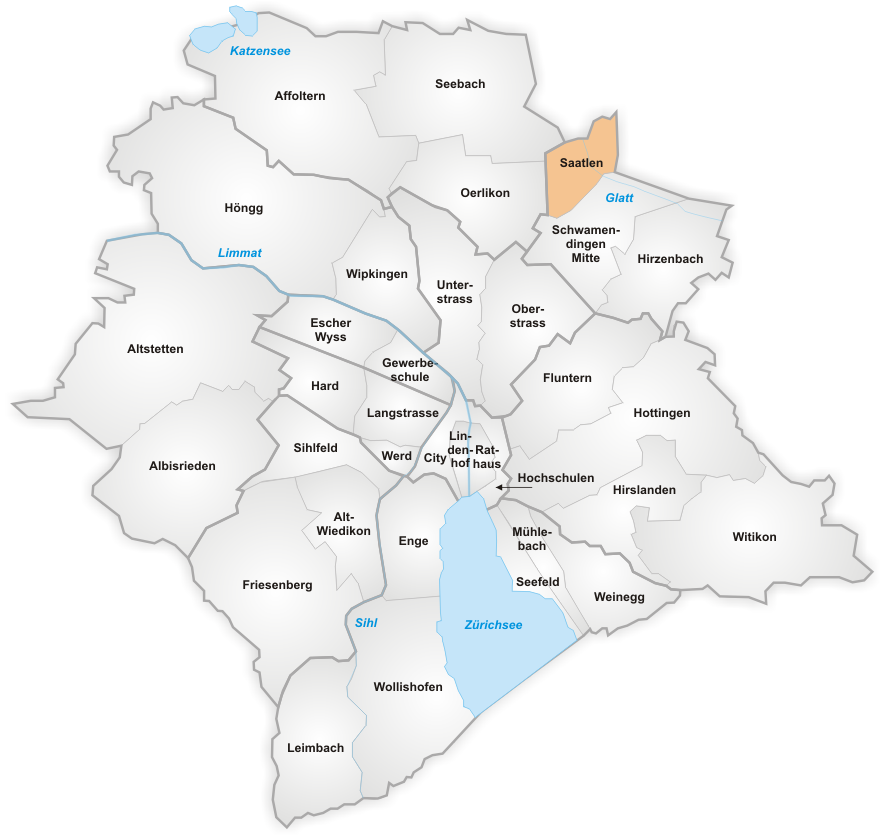
- The quarter of Saatlen in Zürich
- Country: Switzerland
- Canton: Zurich
- Municipality: Zurich
- District: Schwamendingen

Area
  - Total: 1.13 km^{2} (0.44 sq mi)

Population (2024-12-31)
  - Total: 8,814
  - Density: 7,800/km^{2} (20,200/sq mi)
- Postal code: 8050

Saatlen is a quarter in the district 12 of Zürich, located in the Glatt Valley (German: Glattal). Together with quarters Schwamendingen Mitte and Hirzenbach, it forms the district 12 called Schwamendingen.

== History ==
At the beginning of the 1940s, the "Projekt der Gartenstadt" (literally "garden city project") was planned in the Au/Auzelg area. Due to the severe housing shortage in the center of the city, some forced expropriations were carried out in order to provide large families with simple houses including large gardens. The settlement was derogatorily called "Negerdörfli" (literally "Negro village") by the rich townspeople.

Saatlen was part of the former Schwamendingen municipality, which was incorporated into Zürich in 1934.

The A1 motorway opened in 1981 completely disconnected Saatlen from the other quarters of Schwamendingen, Hirzenbach and Schwamendingen Mitte. Since 2025, a roof exists over the highway, including a public park on top, which mitigated this issue.

Even though Saatlen belongs to Schwamendingen, the majority of the population is closely interconnected with the neighboring quarter Oerlikon. That is where the postal service for Saatlen is located, and many public transport lines connect Saatlen with the Oerlikon railway station.

=== Demographic Development ===
Historical population
| Year | Pop. | ±% |
|---|---|---|
| 1930 | 182 | — |
| 1941 | 582 | +219.8% |
| 1950 | 5,754 | +888.7% |
| 1960 | 7,957 | +38.3% |
| 1970 | 7,297 | −8.3% |
| 1980 | 6,834 | −6.3% |
| 1990 | 6,428 | −5.9% |
| 2000 | 6,338 | −1.4% |
| 2010 | 7,175 | +13.2% |
| 2024 | 8,814 | +22.8% |

== Geography ==
The north part of Saatlen is referred to as the Auzelg settlement, the west is called Hagenholz, and the south Dreispitz. There are large areas with many allotment gardens, which form the border to the neighboring municipalities Opfikon and Wallisellen. Dreispitz in the south containing many cooperative buildings was constructed in the 1950s.

In the south east, the A1 motorway forms the border to the quarter Schwamendingen Mitte. The heat and power station Aubrugg located on the municipal area of Wallisellen provides the north of Zurich with district heating. The incinerator plant Hagenholz is located in the north west. Both are visible from far away. The Riedgrabenweg in the west forms the border to the Oerlikon quarter.

== Religious communities ==
Reformed residents belong to the Saatlen parish with the Kirche Saatlen (Saatlen church), which was created in 1966 from a division of the Schwamendingen parish. It has almost 1,600 members (as of 2008). The Roman Catholic residents who live in Saatlen belong to the parish of Herz Jesu Oerlikon. If they live in Auzelg, they belong to the parish of St. Gallus in Schwamendingen. The Heilsarmee (Salvation Army) is also active in the area. Finally, the number of Muslims has increased significantly in recent years.

== Transport Infrastructure ==
=== Private transport ===
The A1 motorway runs in the southeast of the quarter and branches off in the east via bridges, towards Winterthur and Kloten. The busy roads Ueberland-, Wallisellen-, Aubrugg-, and Hagenholzstrasse are also a significant part of this quarter. Like the other Schwamendingen districts, Saatlen is traffic-calmed due to comprehensive low-speed 30 km/h zones.

=== Public transport ===
Bus lines 61, 62, 75, 781, and 787 connect Saatlen with the surrounding quarters and municipalities:

- 61: Mühlacker – Bahnhof Affoltern – Bahnhof Oerlikon – Aubrücke – Wallisellen, Glatt
- 62: Waidhof – Bahnhof Affoltern – Bahnhof Oerlikon – Saatlenstrasse – Schwamendingerplatz
- 75: Seebacherplatz – Schönauring – Bahnhof Oerlikon Ost – Schwamendingerplatz (– Auzelg Ost)
- 781: Bahnhof Oerlikon – Hagenholz – Glattpark – Glattbrugg, Giebeleichstrasse
- 787: Bahnhof Oerlikon – Hagenholz – Aubrücke – Wallisellen, Glatt – Dietlikon, Bahnhof – Brüttisellen, Obere Wangenstrasse

Additionally, tram lines 12 and 50 run through the north of Saatlen, as well as tram lines 7 and 9 running along the southern border towards Schwamendingen Mitte:

- 7: Bahnhof Stettbach – Schwamendingerplatz – Milchbuck – Schaffhauserplatz – Hauptbahnhof – Paradeplatz – Bahnhof Enge – Wollishoferplatz
- 9: Hirzenbach – Schwamendingerplatz – Milchbuck – ETH/Universitätsspital – Bellevue – Paradeplatz – Stauffacher – Heuried (– Triemli)
- 12: Bahnhof Stettbach – Wallisellen, Bahnhof – Auzelg – Glattbrugg, Bahnhof – Zürich Flughafen, Fracht
- 50, a temporary tram line until December 2026: Auzelg – Glattpark – Sternen Oerlikon – Schaffhauserplatz – Sihlquai/HB – Escher-Wyss-Path – Frankental

Although the S-Bahn line coming from Winterthur leading to Oerlikon crosses the north of the district, there is no dedicated stop.

The Glattalbahn operating since 2006, including tram line number 12, connects the quarter with the north of Zurich.
