= Districts of Zurich =

Municipal districts of Zurich, Switzerland

The City of Zurich is divided into twelve districts (known as Kreise in German), numbered 1 to 12, each one of which containing, depending on the definition, anywhere between 1 to 4 quarters (or Quartiere in German). There are a total of 22 ceremonial quarters (6 of which being coterminous with their districts, namely the Altstadt, Wiedikon, Aussersihl, the Industriequartier, Riesbach, and Schwamendingen), 34 statistical quarters, and over 200 statistical areas. Zurich is also divided into 25 postal areas, which are typically aligned with district and quarter boundaries.

Two large expansions of the city limits occurred in 1893 and in 1934 when the City of Zurich merged with many surrounding municipalities with which it had started to overlap. Most of the district and quarter boundaries are fairly similar to the original boundaries of the previously-existing municipalities. Four currently-independent surrounding municipalities (Kilchberg, Oberengstringen, Schlieren, and Zollikon) had been seen as incorporation candidates, though the 1929 initiative which proposed to integrate them (alongside others) failed to gain the approval of the cantonal electorate, and they were subsequently not included in the 1934 incorporations.

Politically, the significance of the city districts has diminished, particularly as some districts have been merged together to form electoral districts. School districts are not fully aligned with city districts, and neither are notary districts or Roman Catholic church parishes (though Reformed parishes more closely follow district boundaries).

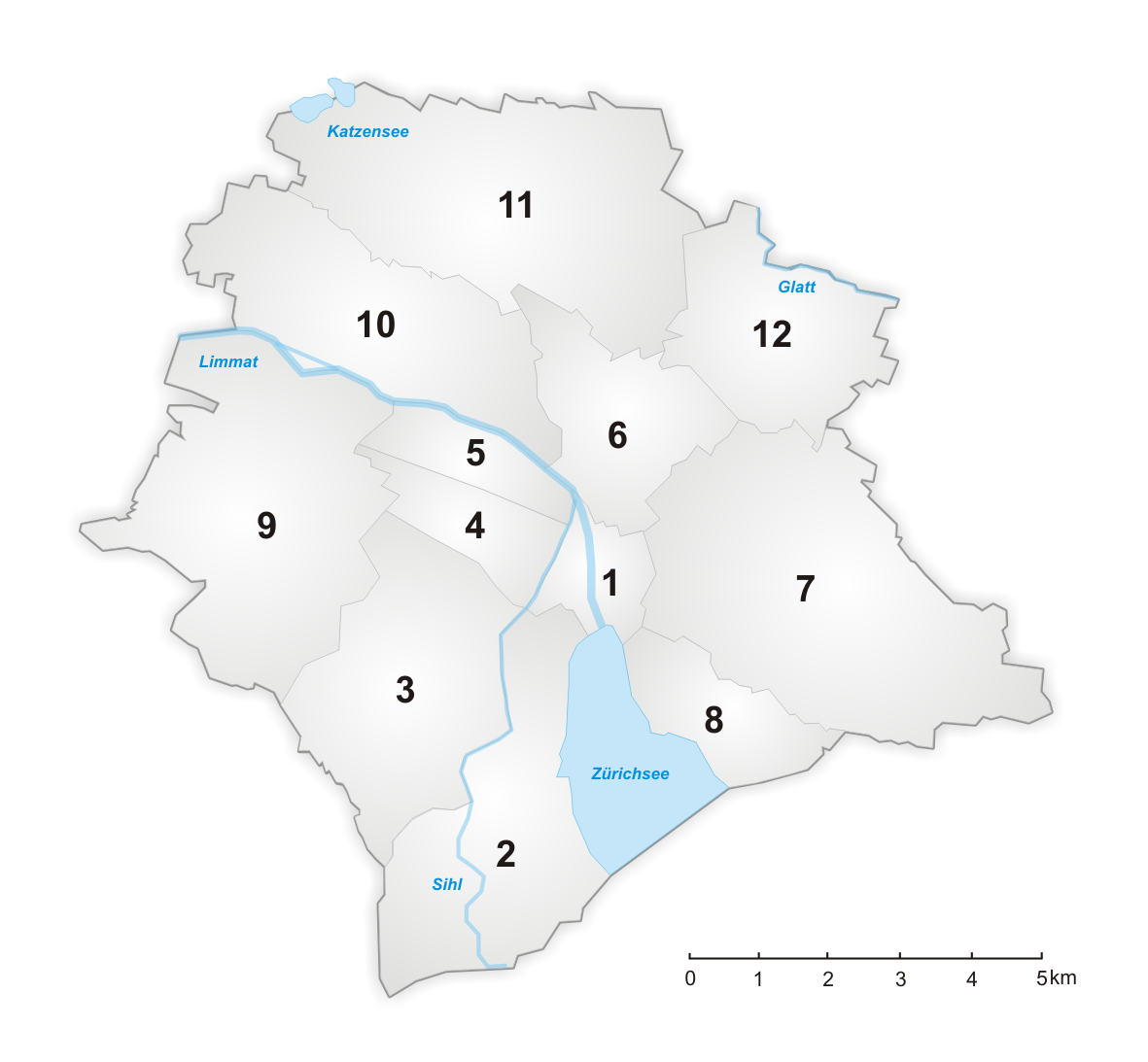
City districts (Stadtkreise)

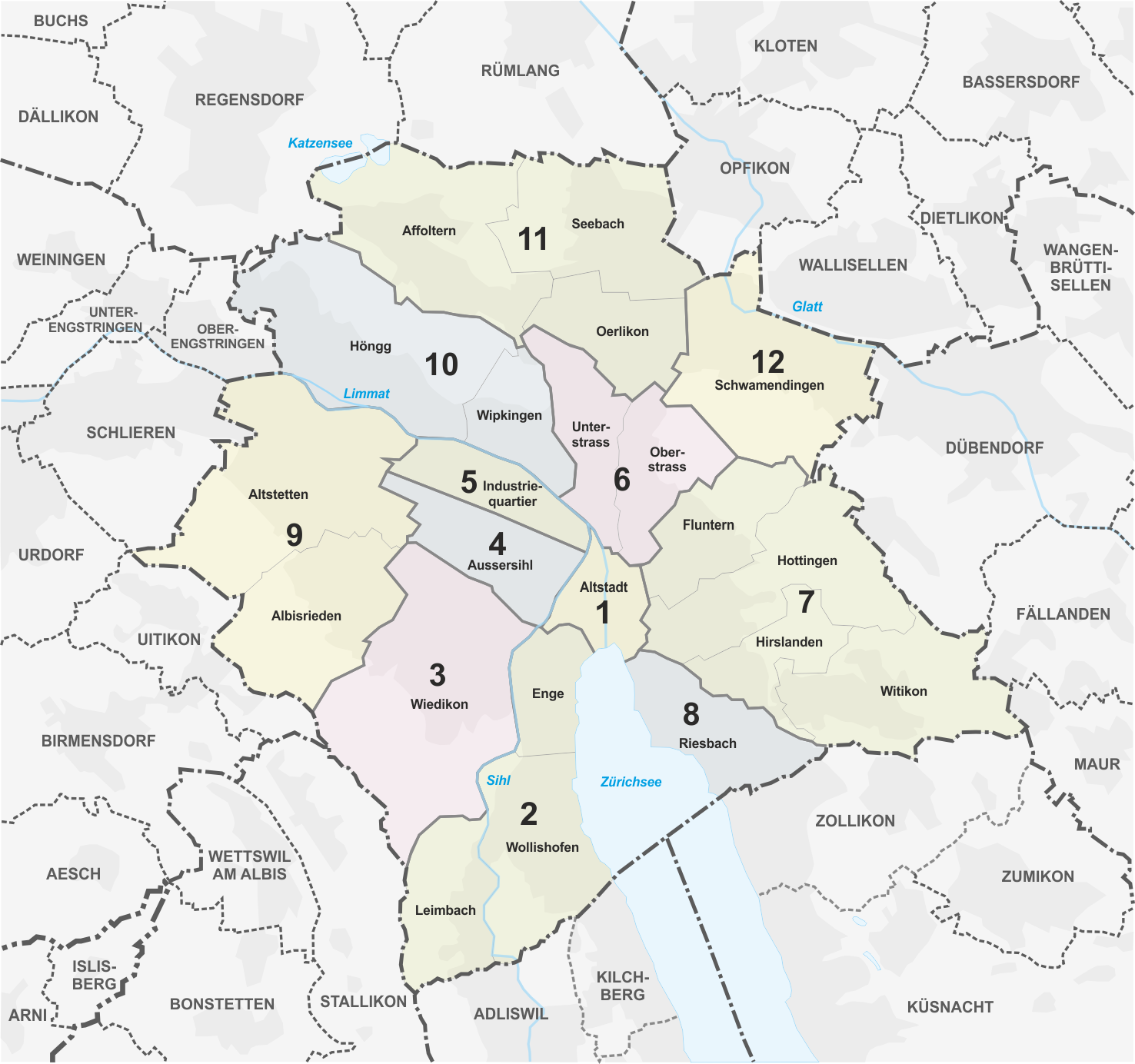
Ceremonial quarters (Stadtquartiere)

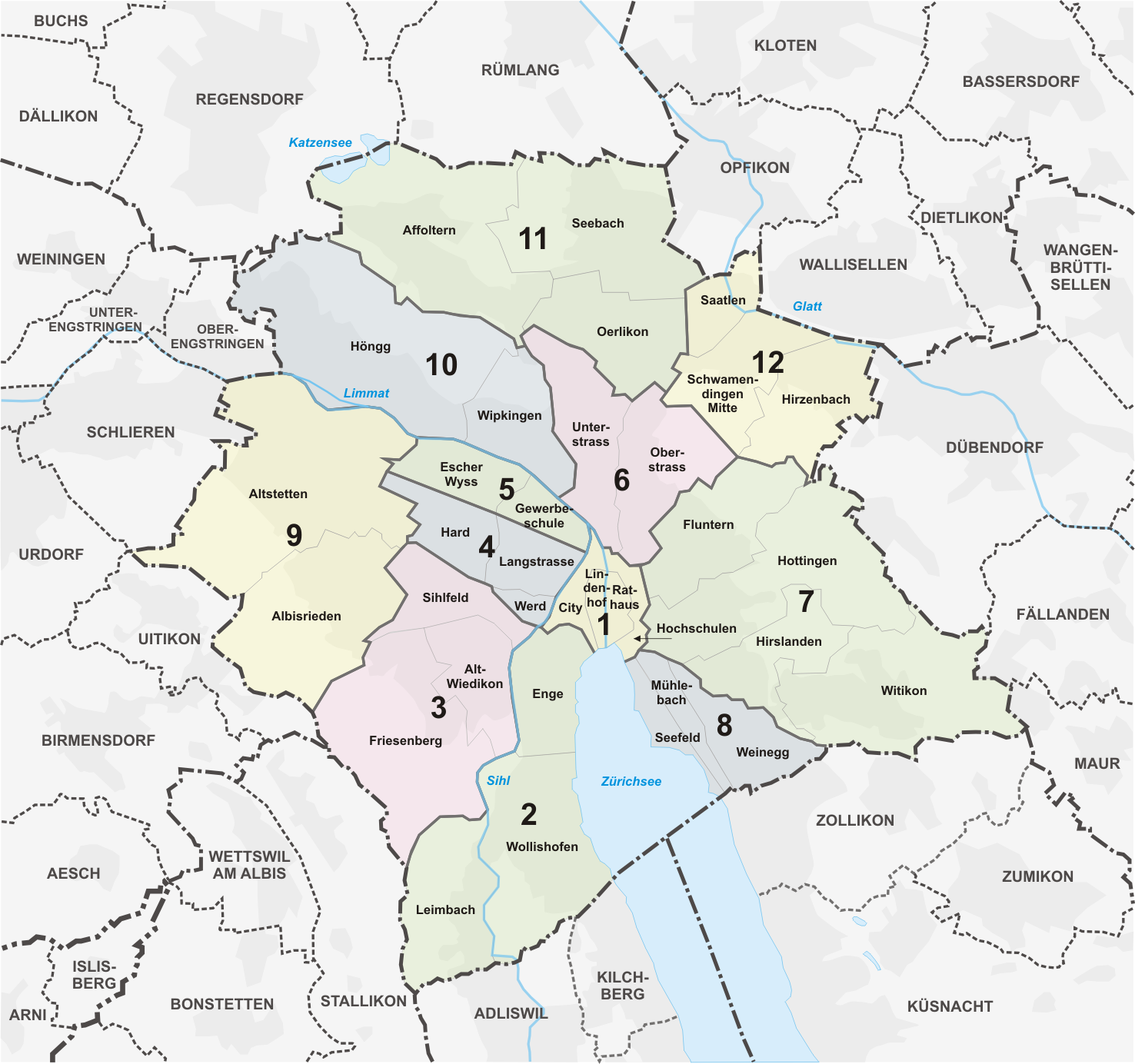
Statistical quarters (statistische Quartiere)

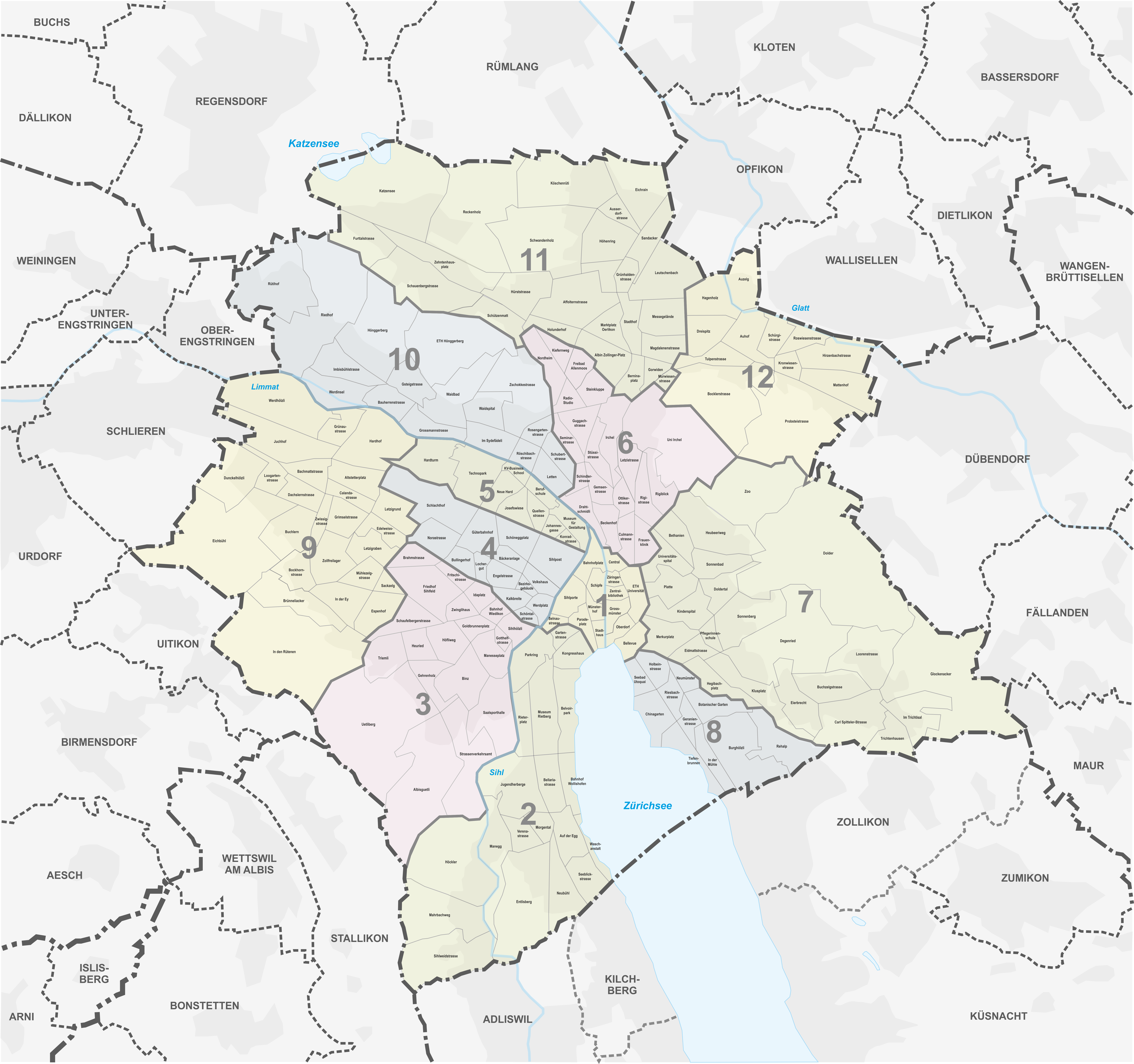
Statistical areas (statistische Zonen)

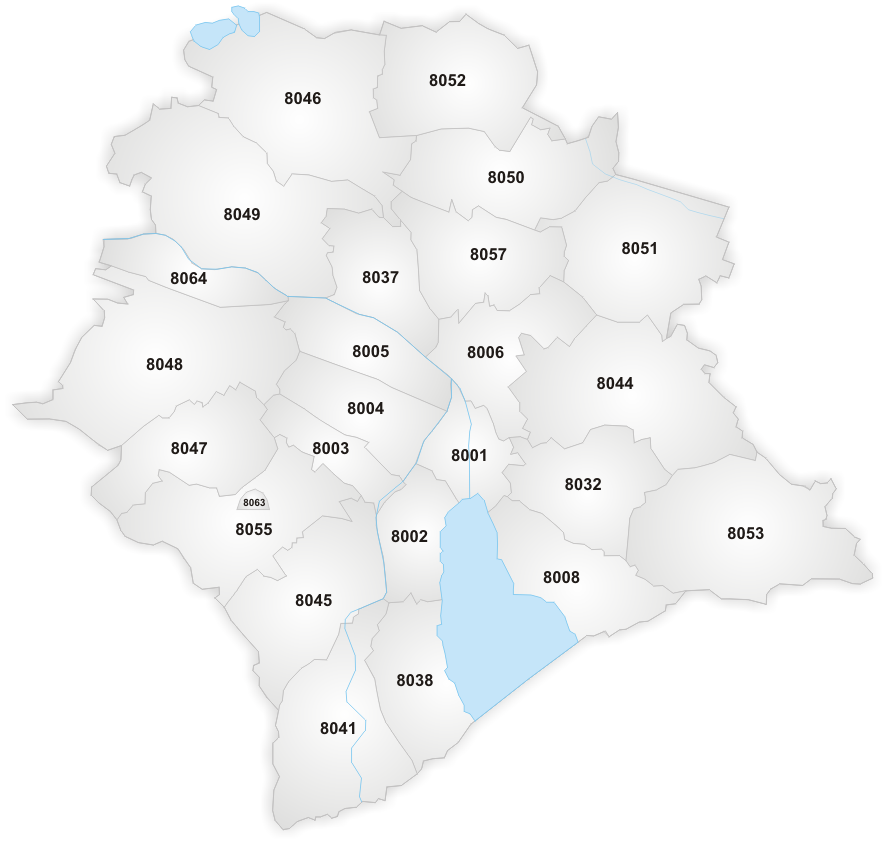
Postcode areas (Postleitzahlgebiete)

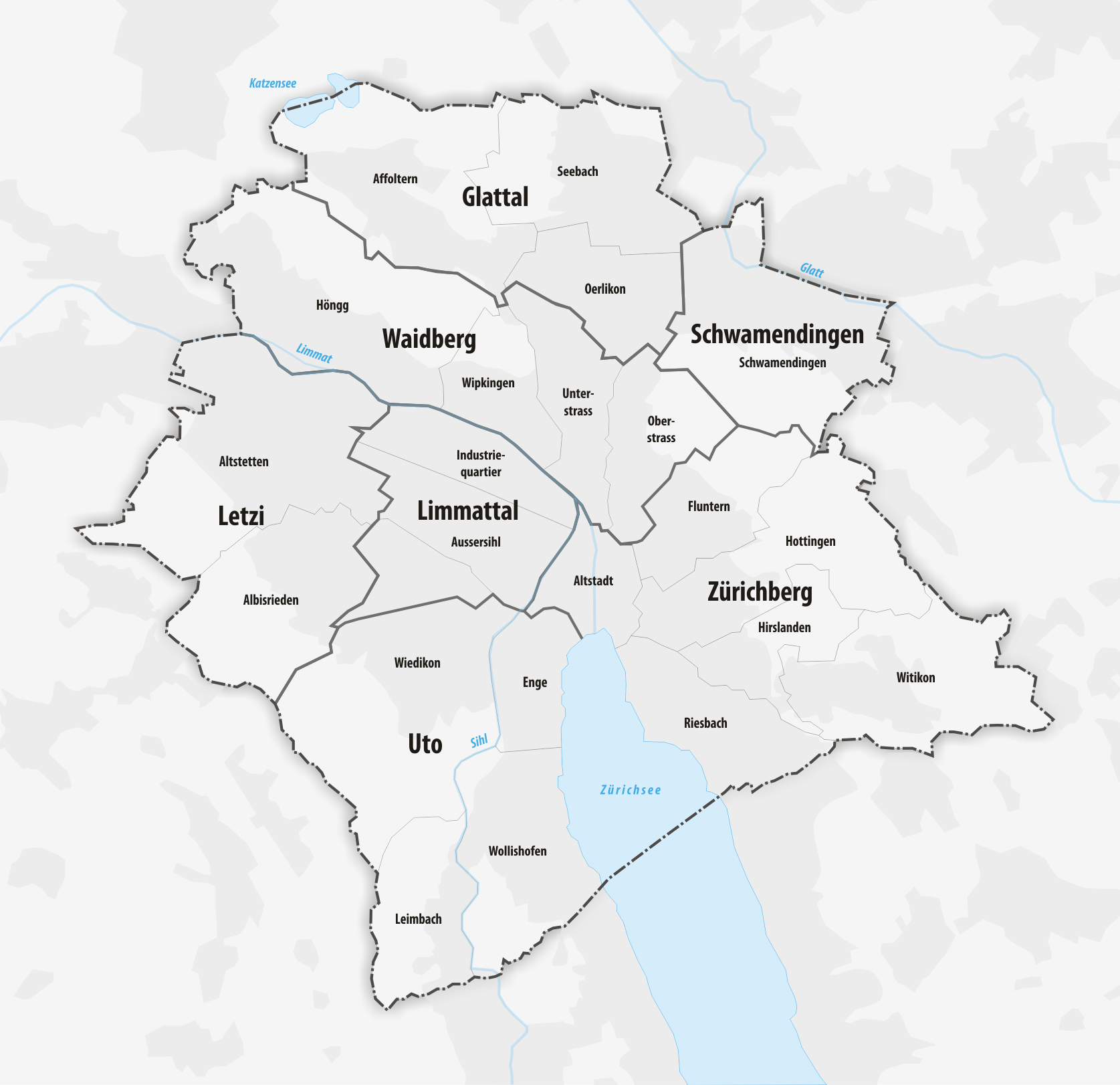
School districts (Schulkreise)

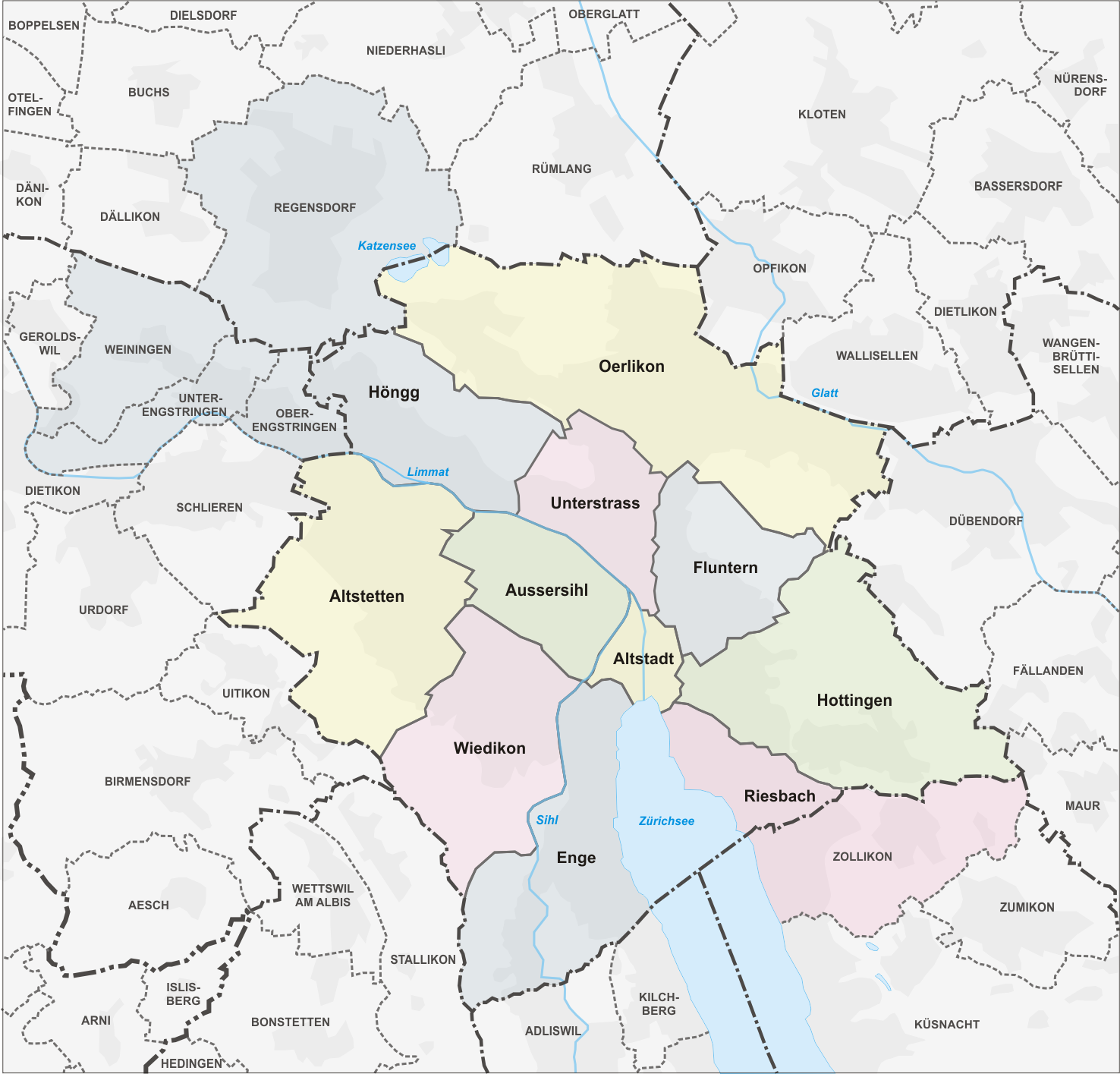
Notary districts (Notariatskreise)

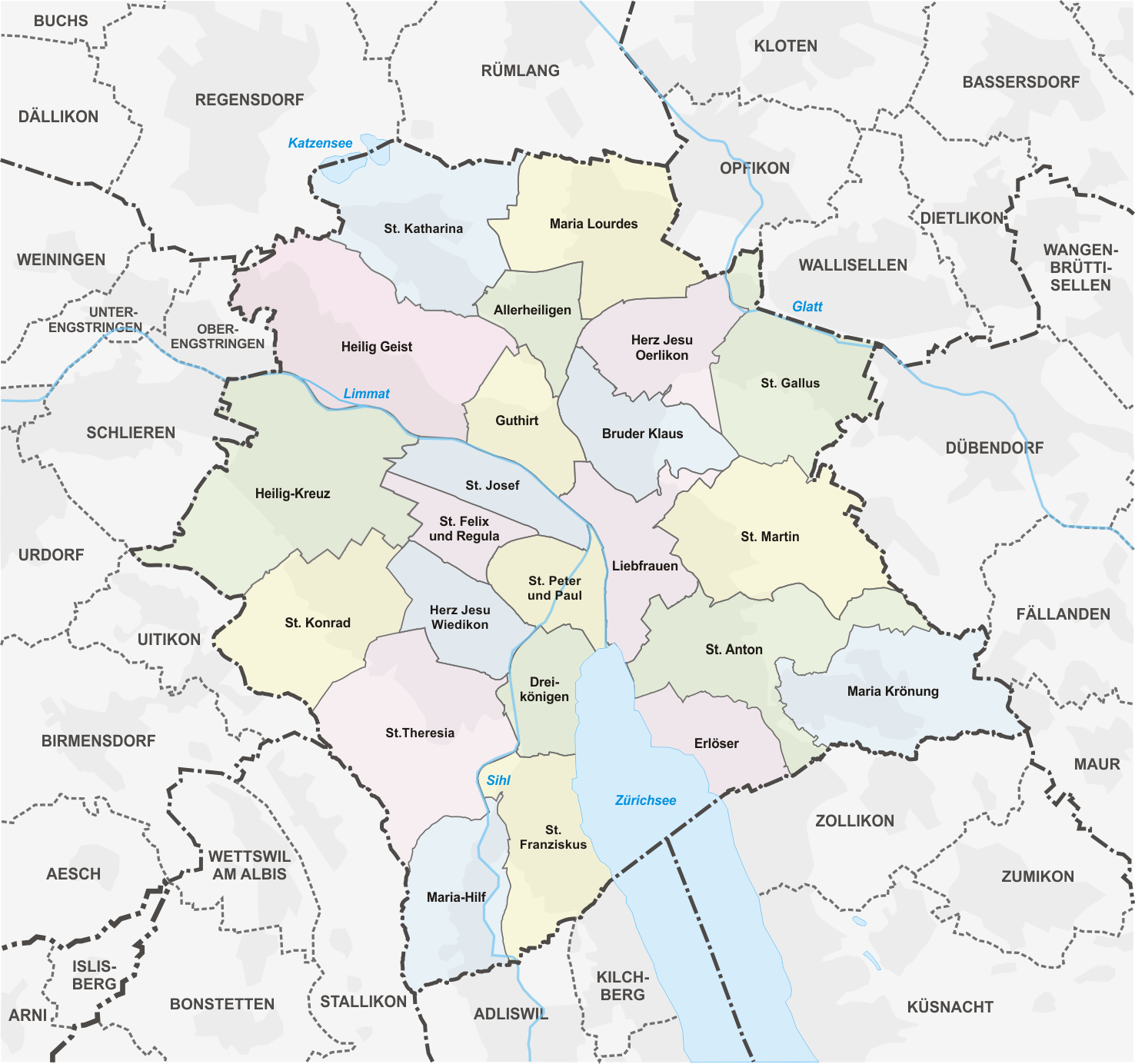
Roman Catholic Church parishes

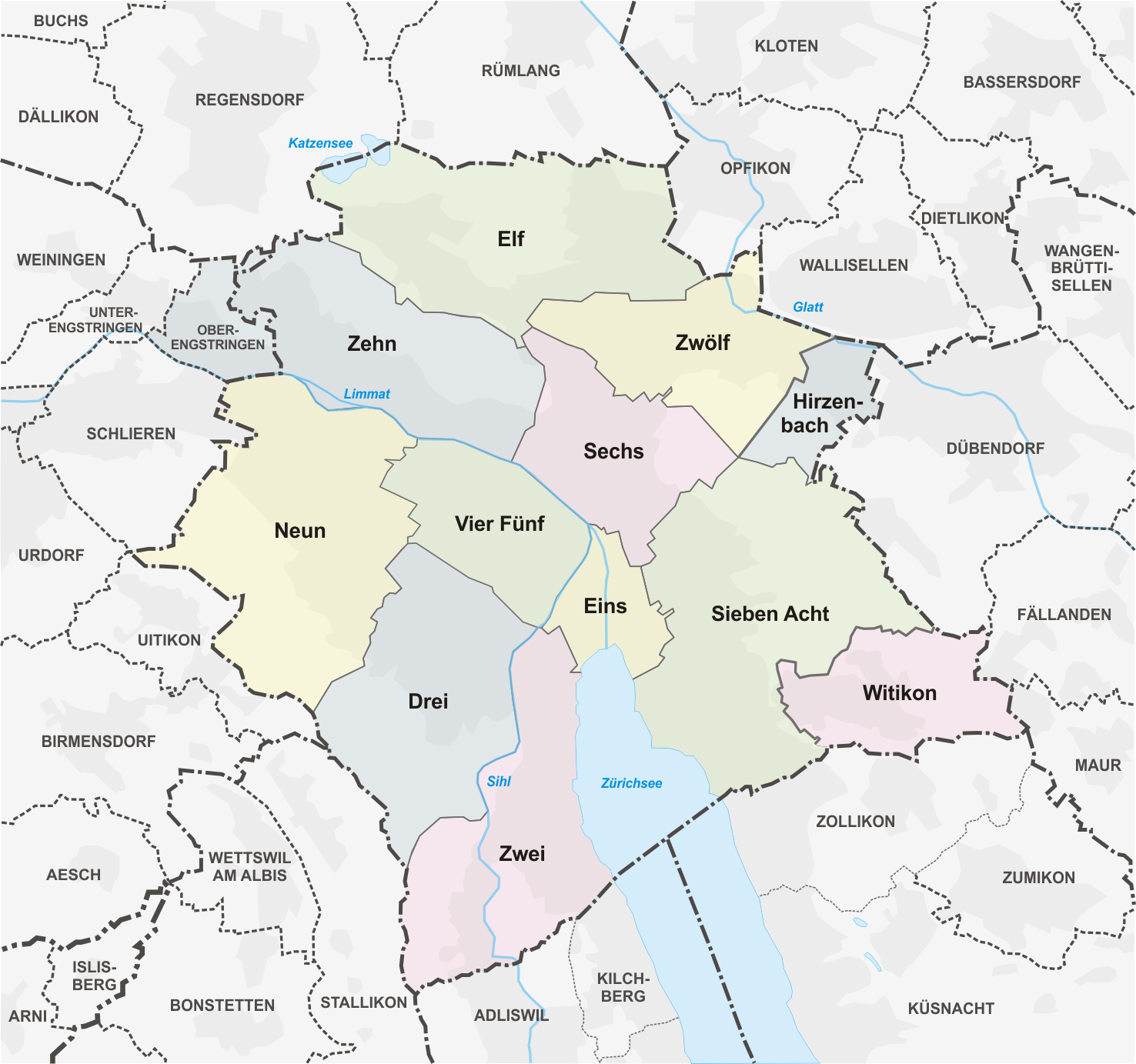
Reformed Church parishes

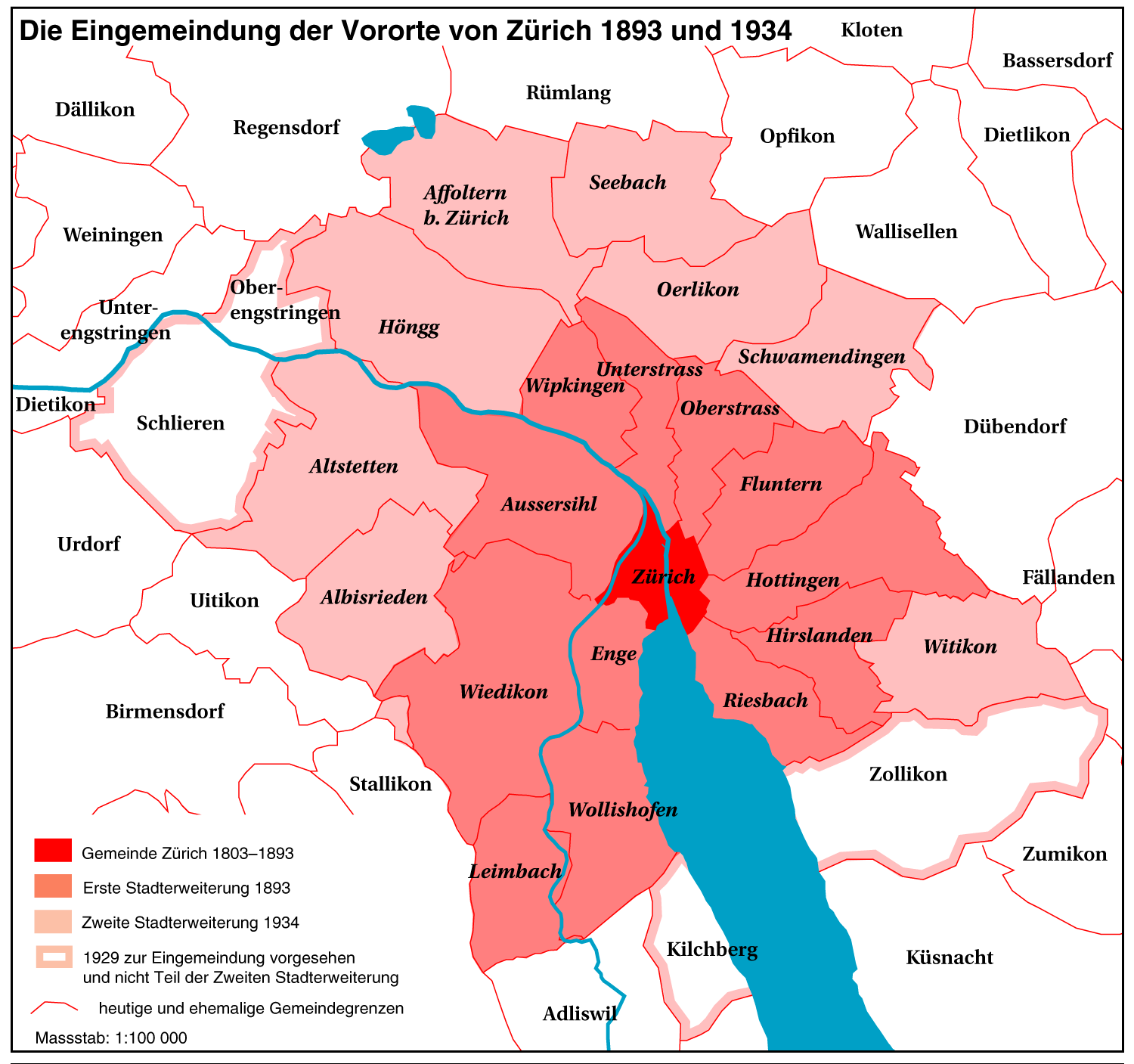
Historical evolution of the City of Zurich

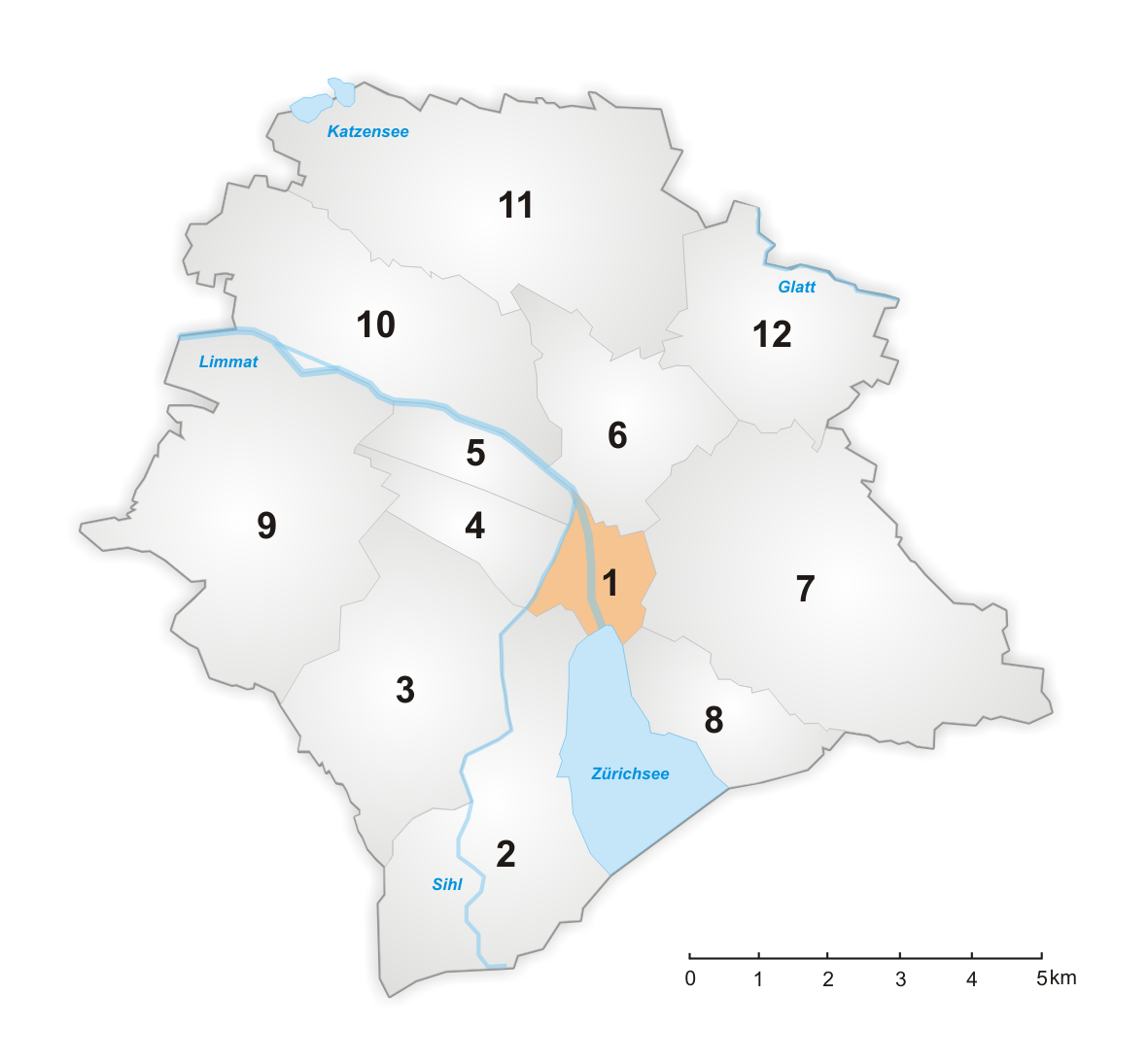
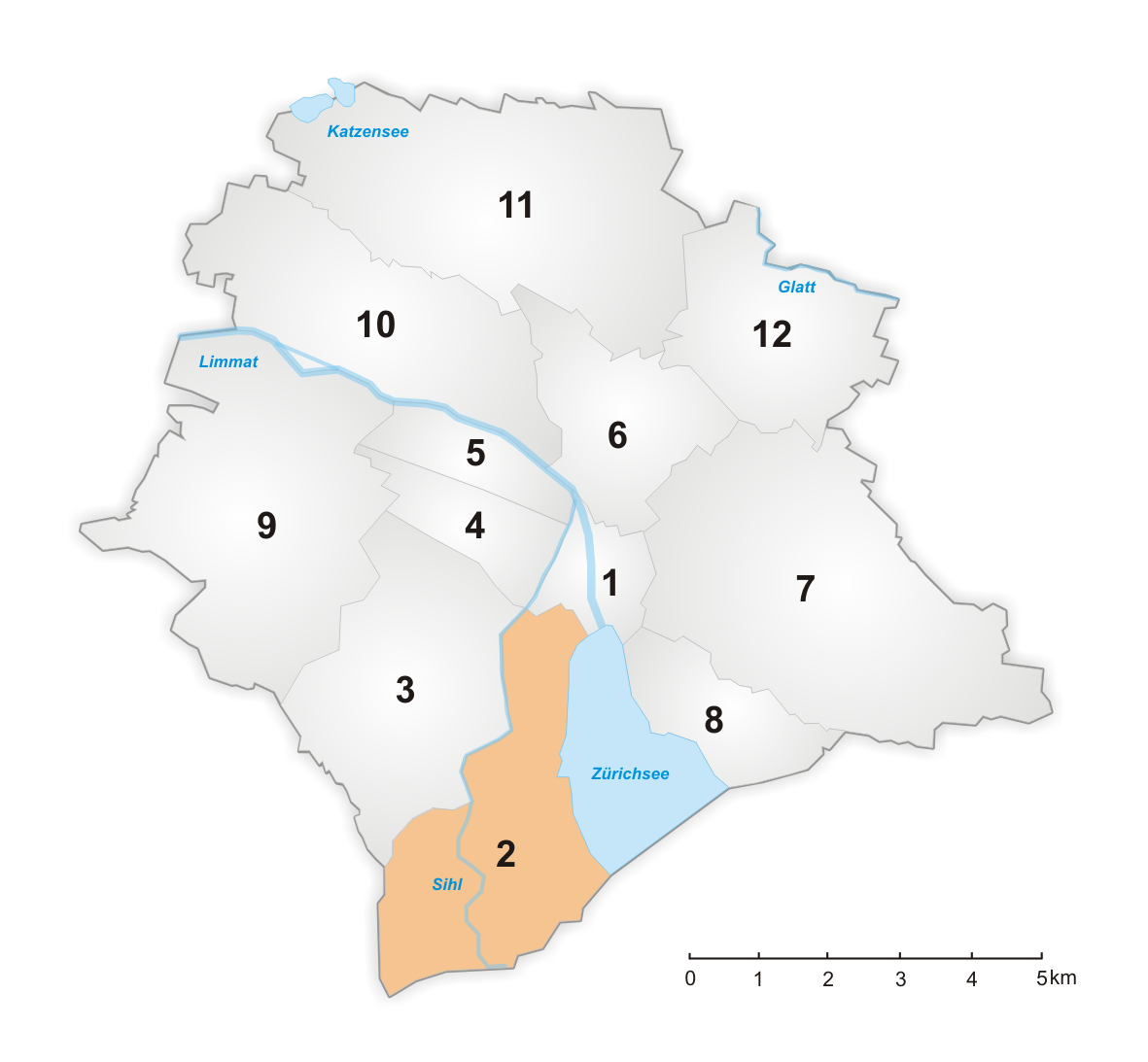
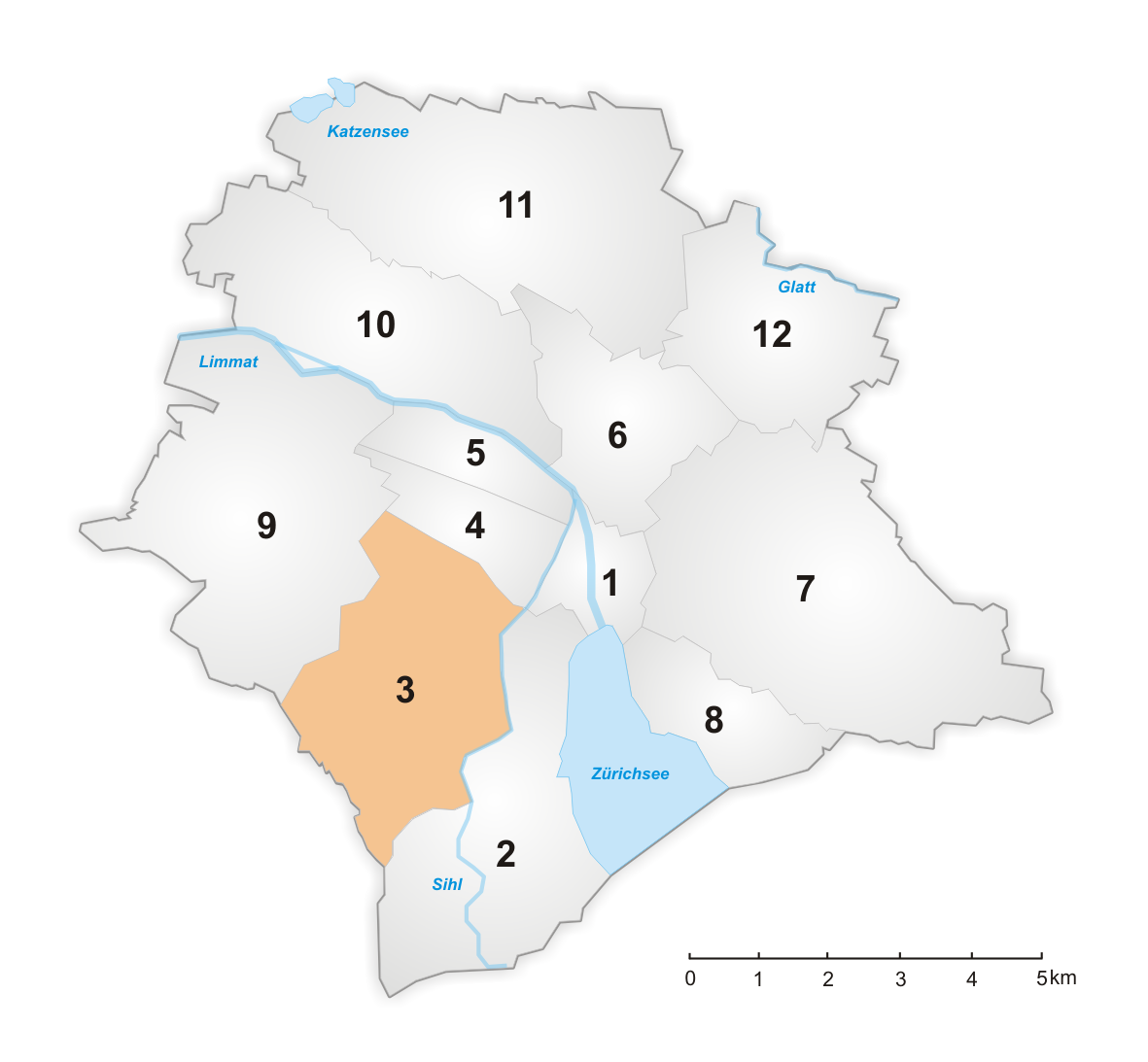
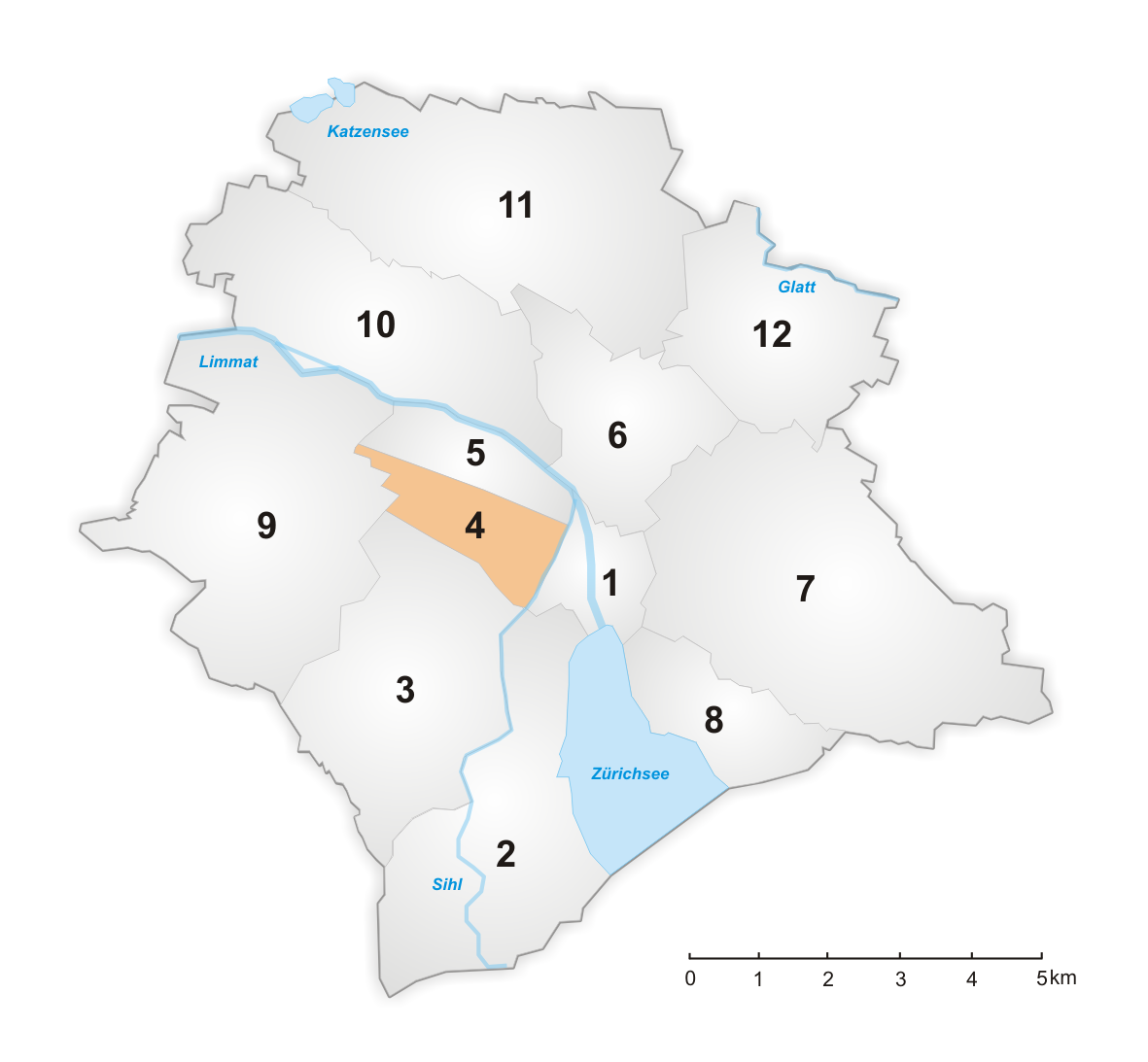
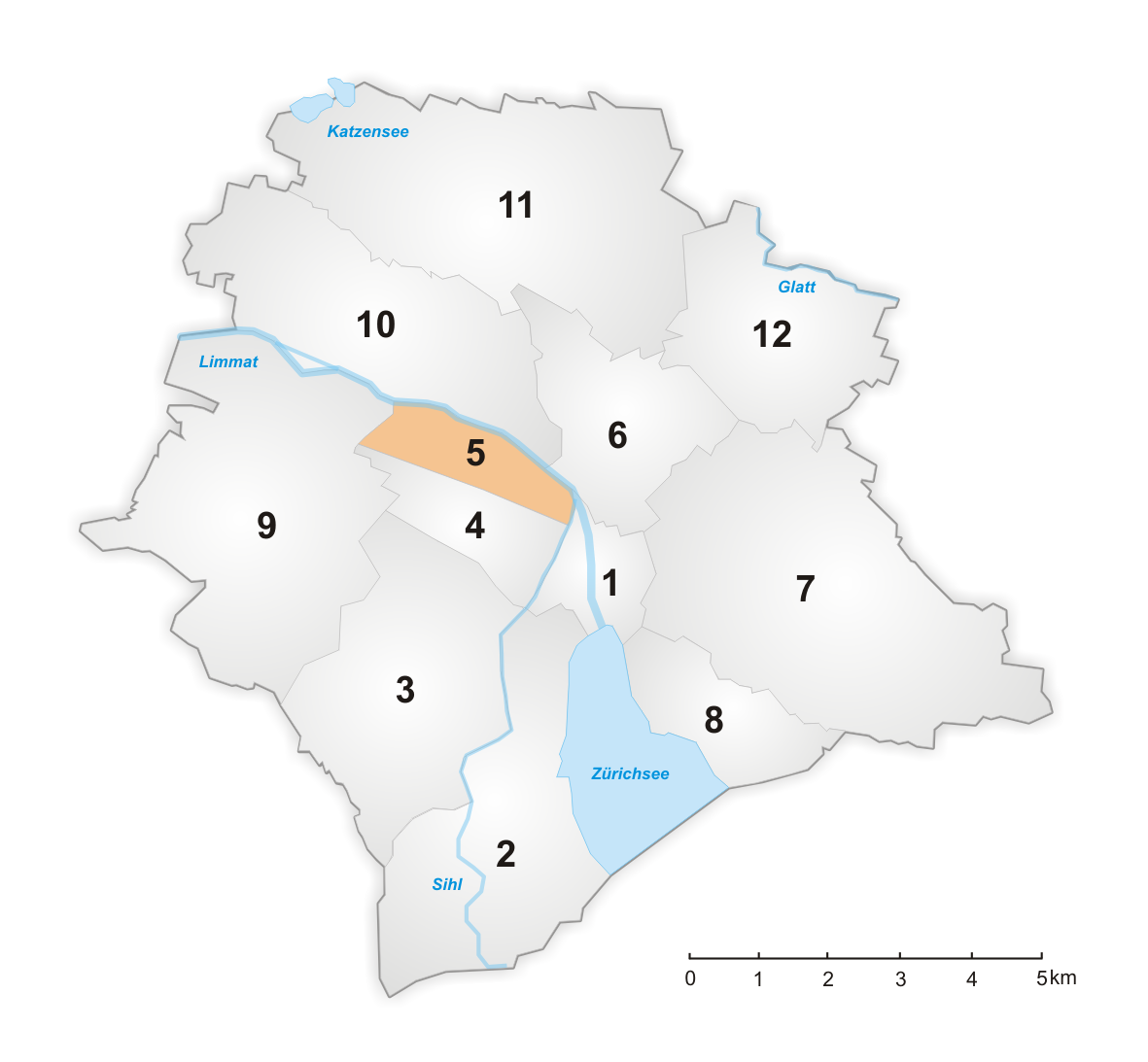
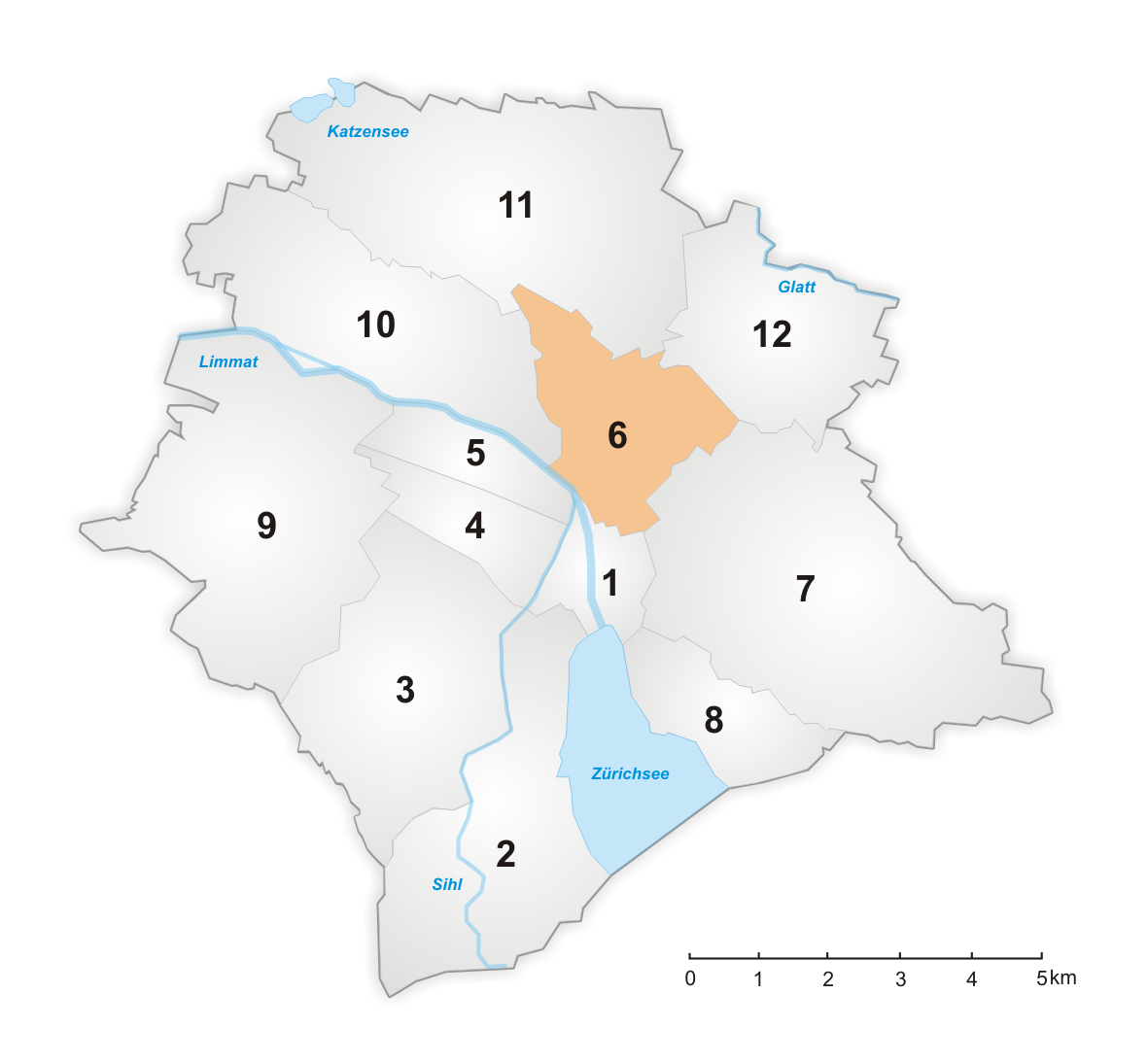
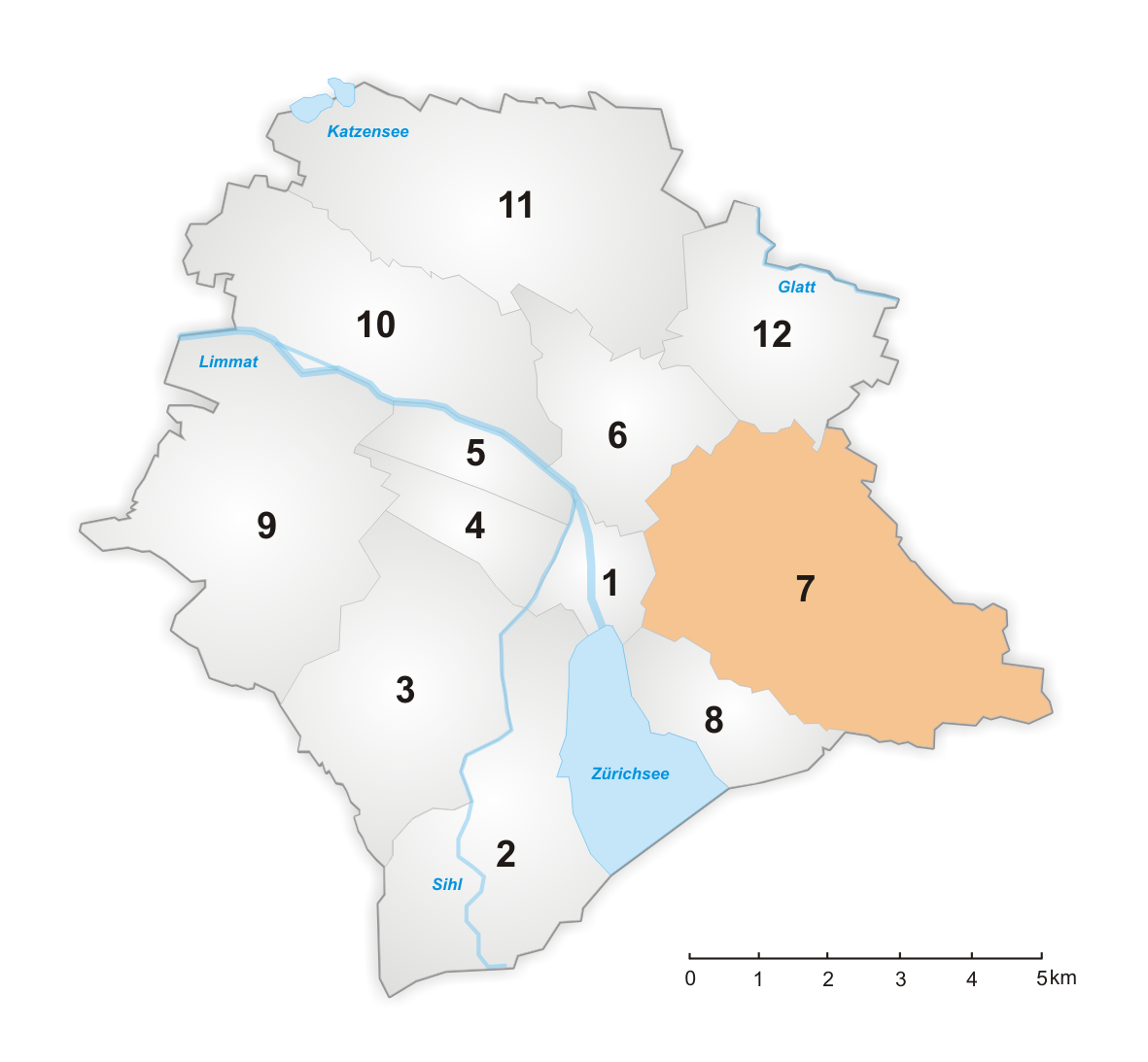
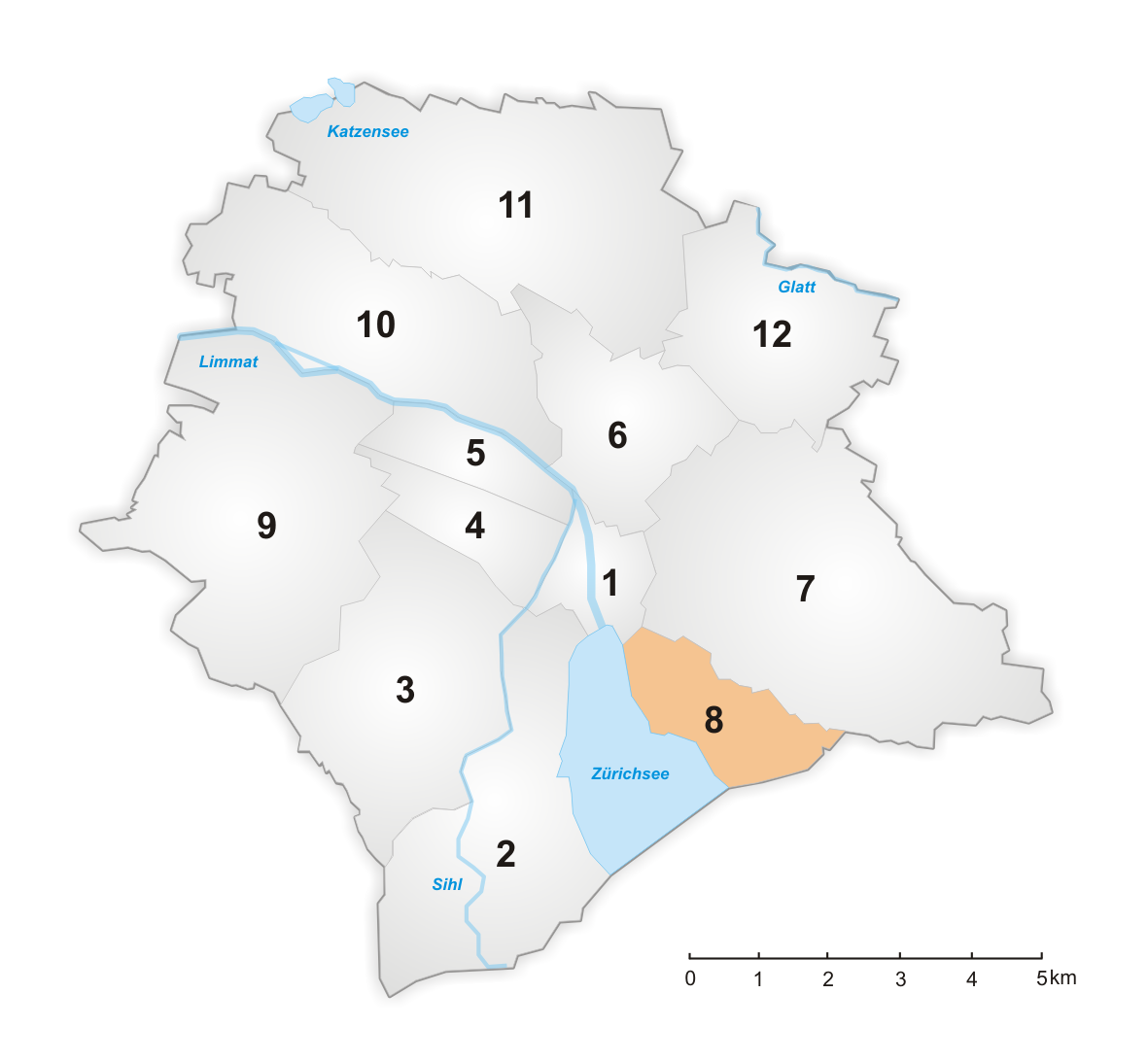
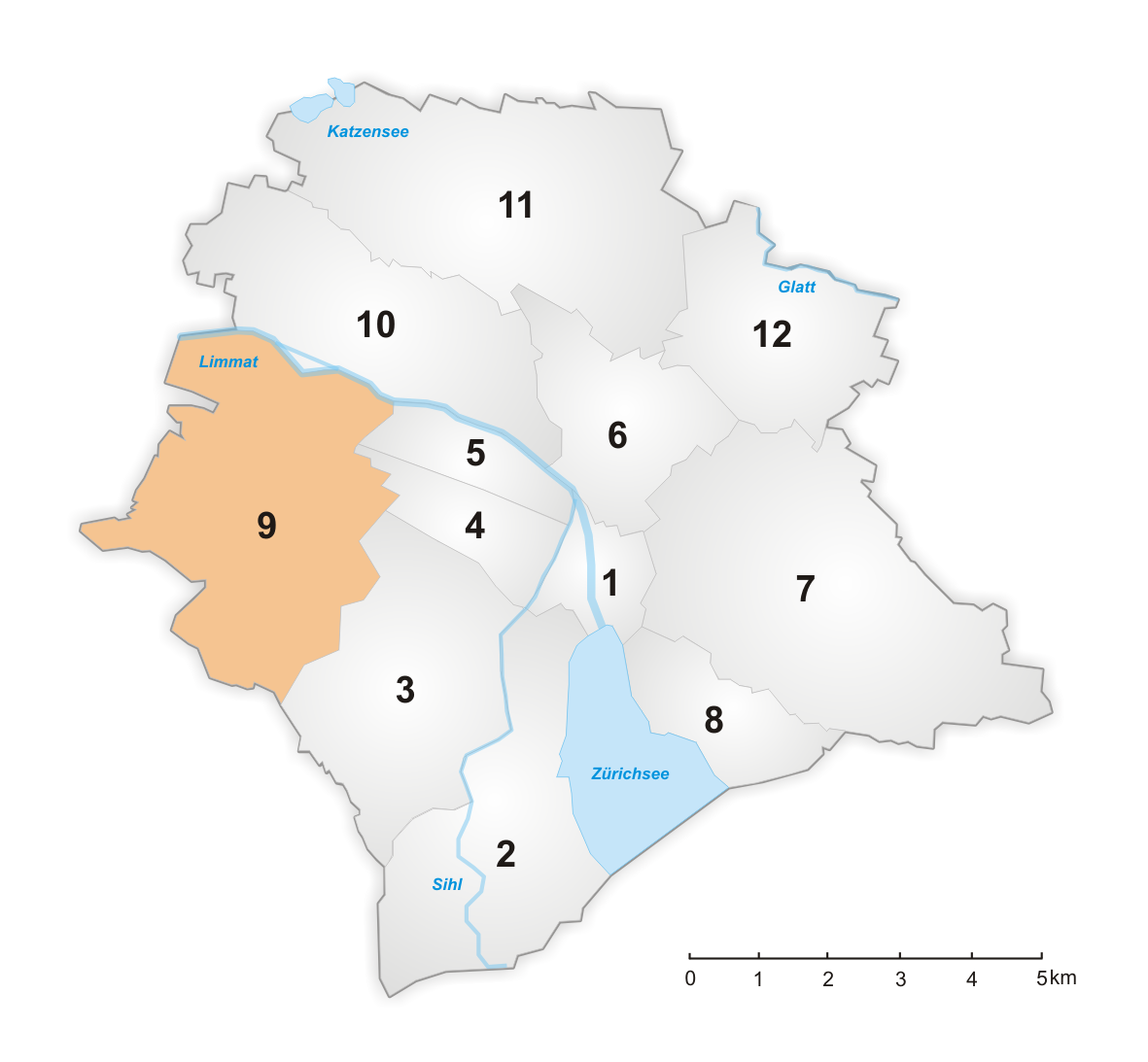
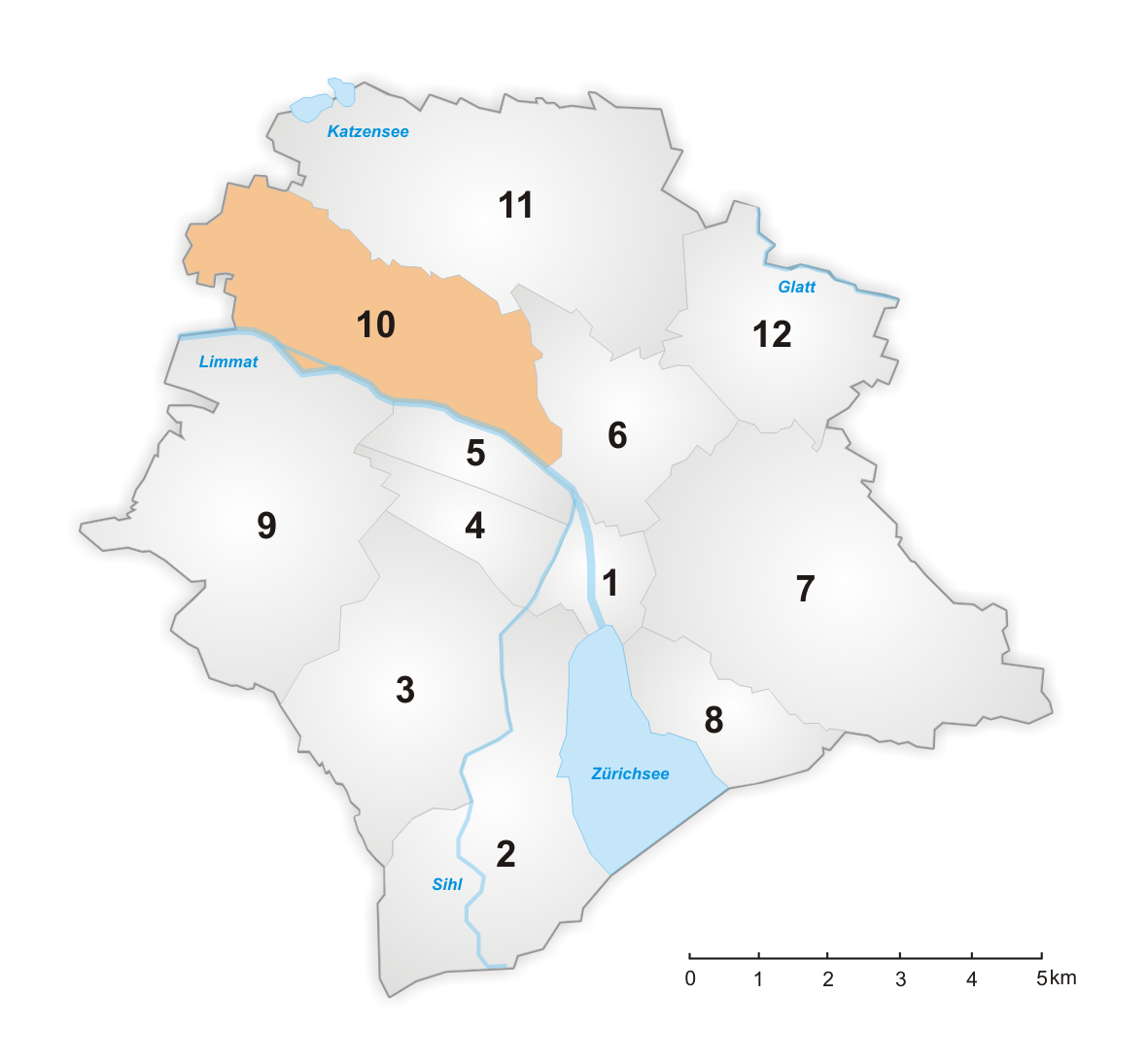
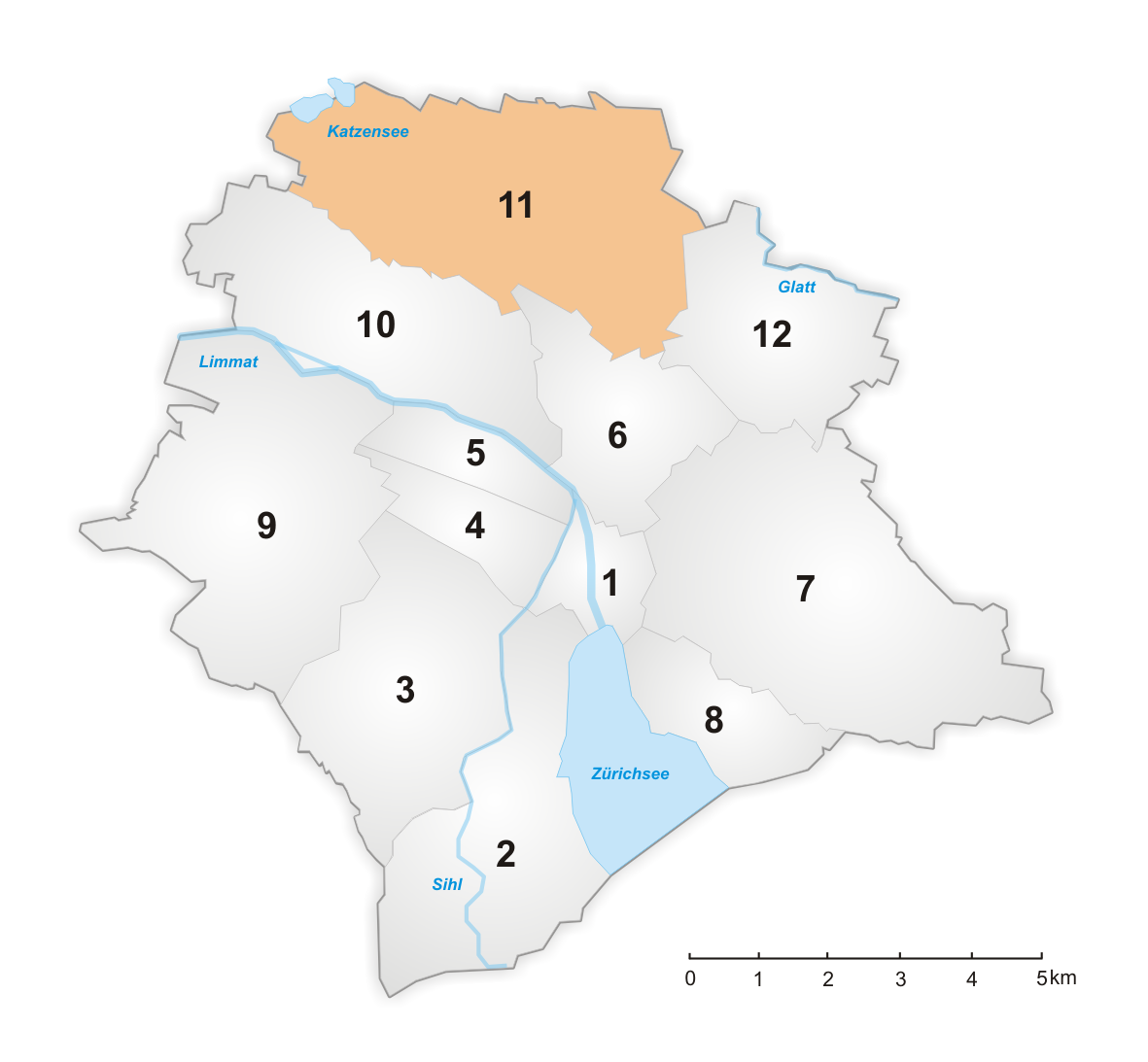
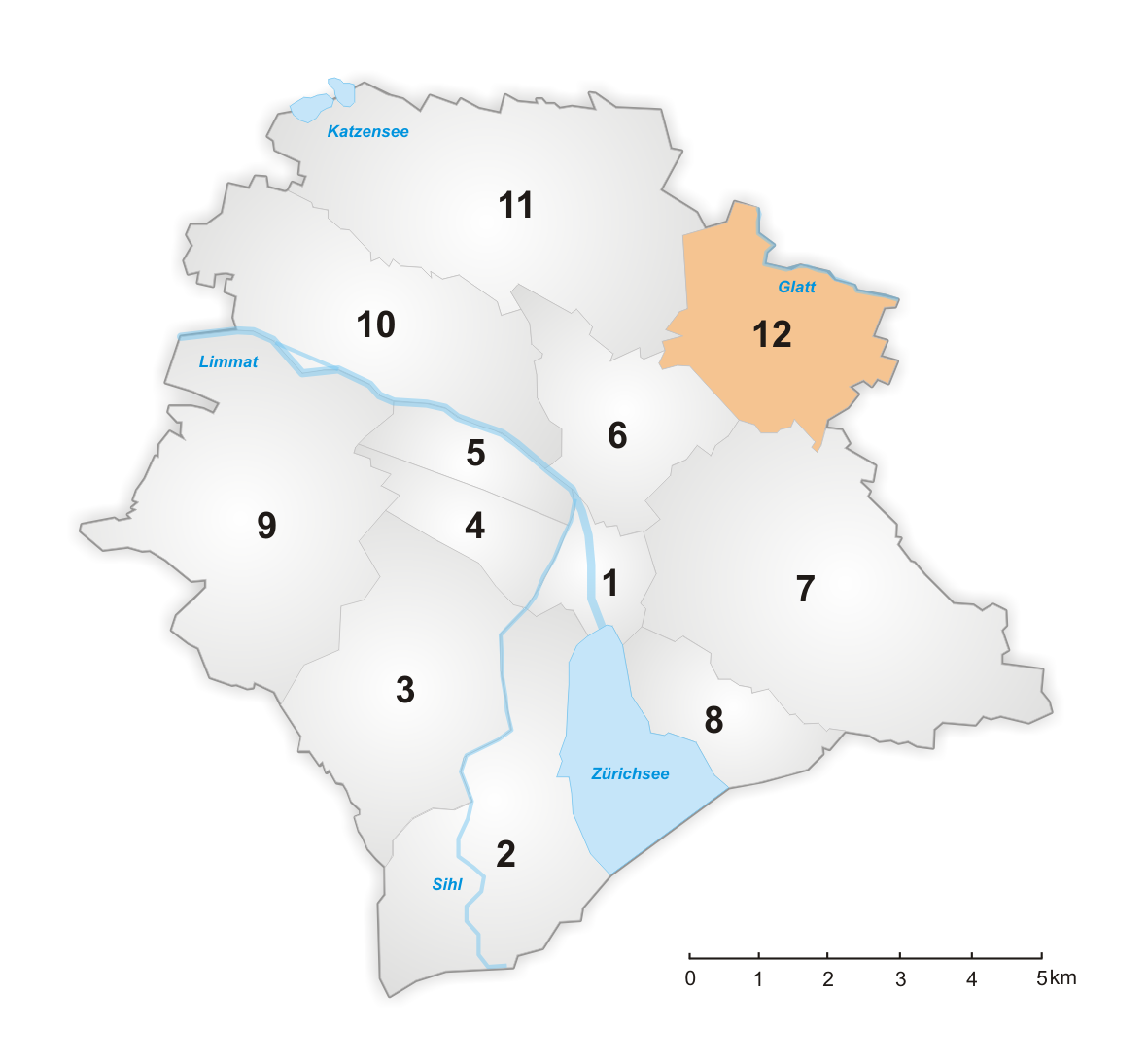
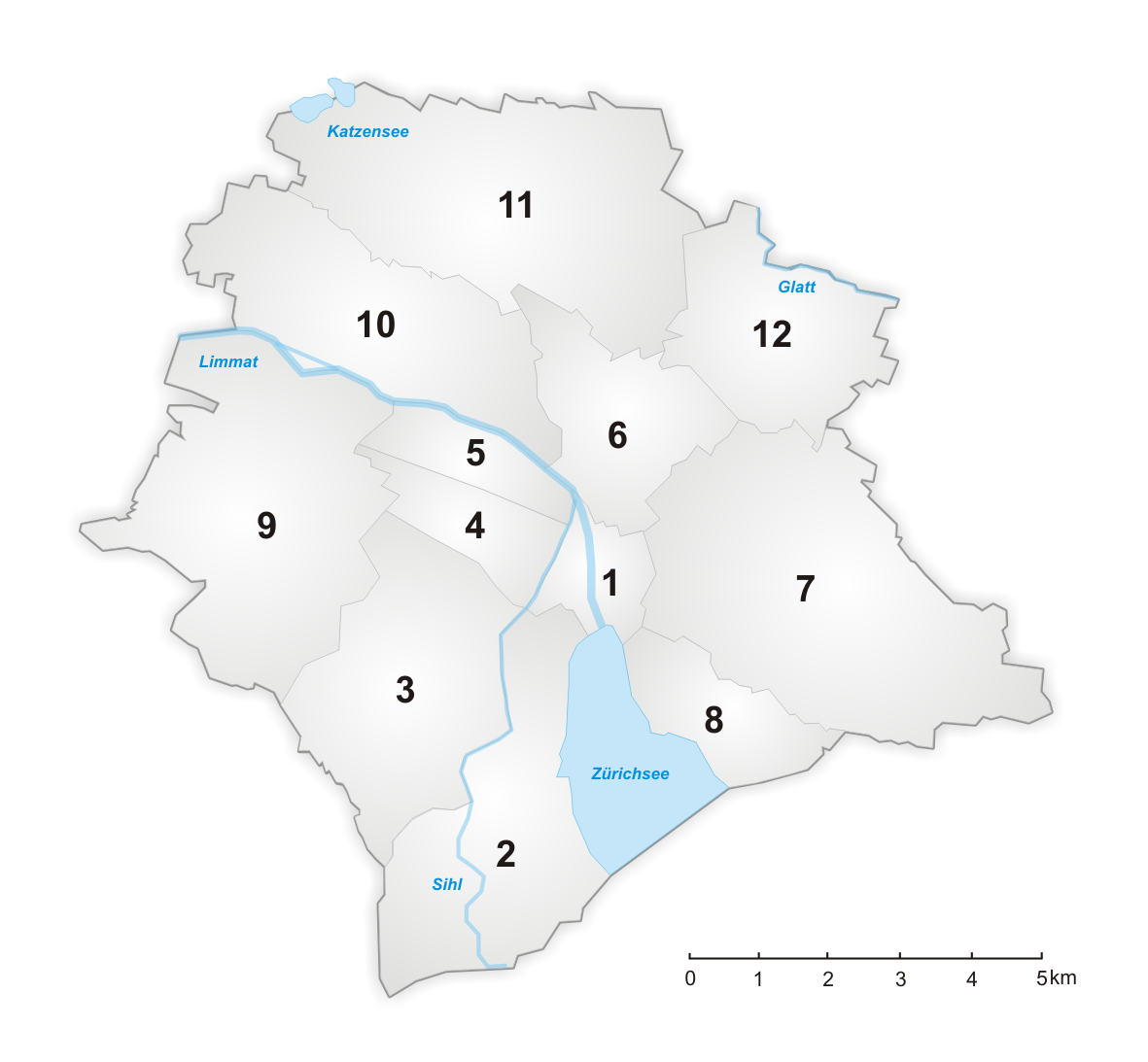
| District | Location | District coat of arms | Quarter coat of arms | Linked neue Zunft | Statistical quarters | BFS-Code | Incorporation | Area in km² | Population 2005 | Non-Swiss Citizens |
|---|---|---|---|---|---|---|---|---|---|---|
| District 1 Altstadt | | Altstadt (Zürich proper) | Altstadt rechts der Limmat Altstadt links der Limmat (und Rennweg) | Stadtzunft | Rathaus Hochschulen Lindenhof City | 261011 261012 261013 261014 | Pre-1893 Pre-1893 Pre-1893 Pre-1893 | 0.38 0.56 0.23 0.64 | 3,081 695 950 846 | 23.9% 27.5% 20.3% 28.3% |
| District 2 | | | Wollishofen Leimbach Enge | Zunft Wollishofen Zunft zu den Drei Königen | Wollishofen Leimbach Enge | 261021 261023 261024 | 1893 1893 1893 | 5.75 2.92 2.40 | 15,592 4,867 8,375 | 22.9% 23.0% 26.0% |
| District 3 Wiedikon | | Wiedikon | Alt-Wiedikon Friesenberg | Zunft zu Wiedikon | Alt-Wiedikon Friesenberg Sihlfeld | 261031 261033 261034 | 1893 1893 1893 | 1.85 5.15 1.64 | 14,971 10,360 20,554 | 32.3% 22.9% 36.5% |
| District 4 Aussersihl | | Aussersihl | Hard | Zunft Hard | Werd Langstrasse Hard | 261041 261042 261044 | 1893 1893 1893 | 0.31 1.13 1.46 | 3,878 10,368 12,715 | 33.2% 41.5% 46.2% |
| District 5 Industriequartier | | Industriequartier | | | Gewerbeschule Escher Wyss | 261051 261052 | 1893 1893 | 0.73 1.27 | 9,690 2,727 | 39.3% 26.1% |
| District 6 | | | Unterstrass Oberstrass | Zunft zu Oberstrass | Unterstrass Oberstrass | 261061 261062 | 1893 1893 | 2.46 2.64 | 19,921 9,494 | 23.6% 24.7% |
| District 7 | | | Fluntern Hottingen Hirslanden Witikon | Zunft Fluntern Zunft Hottingen Zunft Witikon | Fluntern Hottingen Hirslanden Witikon | 261071 261072 261073 261074 | 1893 1893 1893 1934 | 2.84 5.05 2.20 4.93 | 7,325 10,100 6,859 9,864 | 23.7% 23.6% 19.4% 17.3% |
| District 8 Riesbach | | Riesbach | | Zunft Riesbach | Seefeld Mühlebach Weinegg | 261081 261082 261083 | 1893 1893 1893 | 2.45 0.63 1.72 | 4,923 5,577 4,843 | 28.7% 24.6% 25.3% |
| District 9 | | | Albisrieden Altstetten | Zunft zur Letzi | Albisrieden Altstetten | 261091 261092 | 1934 1934 | 4.60 7.47 | 17,226 28,278 | 25.6% 37.0% |
| District 10 | | | Höngg Wipkingen | Zunft Höngg | Höngg Wipkingen | 261101 261102 | 1934 1893 | 6.98 2.11 | 20,773 15,446 | 19.6% 31.1% |
| District 11 | | | Affoltern Oerlikon Seebach | Zunft St. Niklaus | Affoltern Oerlikon Seebach | 261111 261115 261119 | 1934 1934 1934 | 6.04 2.67 4.72 | 18,733 19,585 19,879 | 30.6% 33.7% 36.0% |
| District 12; Schwamendingen | | Schwamendingen | | Zunft Schwamendingen | Saatlen Schwamendingen Mitte Hirzenbach | 261121 261122 261123 | 1934 1934 1934 | 1.13 2.23 2.62 | 6,727 10,322 11,265 | 31.6% 40.6% 37.5% |
| City of Zurich | | Stadt Zürich | | | | | | 91.88 | 366'809 | 30.2% |

== See also ==
- City of Zurich
- Zurich District (cantonal)
- Municipalities of the canton of Zurich
