= Schwamendingen Mitte =

Quarter of the city of Zurich

Coordinates: 47°24′15.12″N 8°34′55.13″E

- Quarter of Zurich
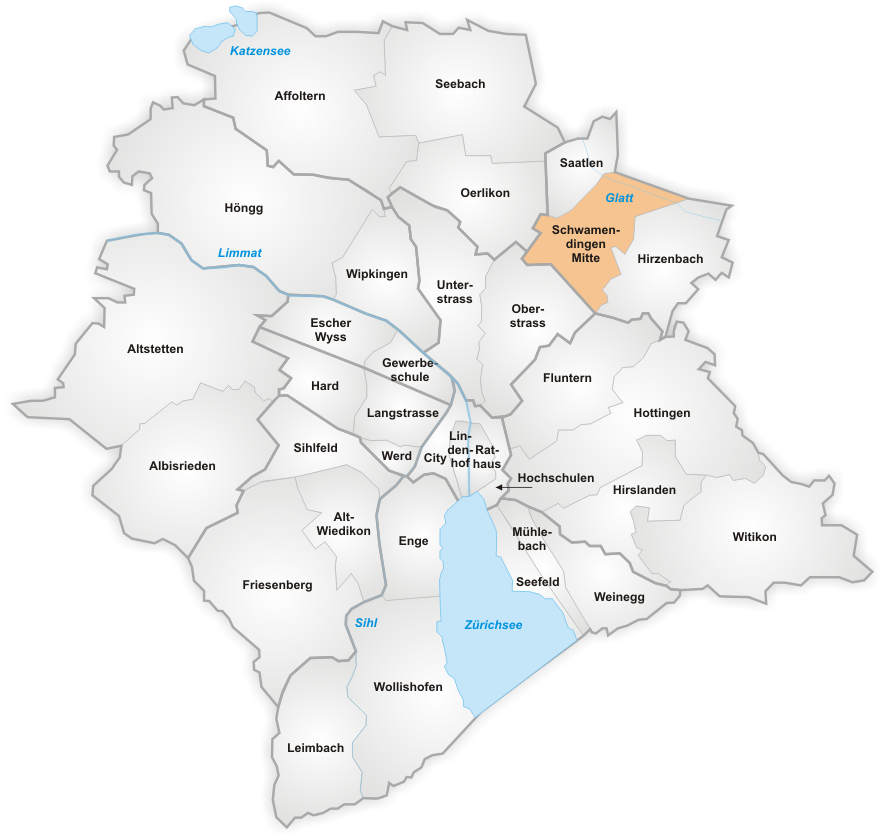
- The quarter of Schwamendingen Mitte in Zürich
- Country: Switzerland
- Canton: Zurich
- Municipality: Zurich
- District: Schwamendingen

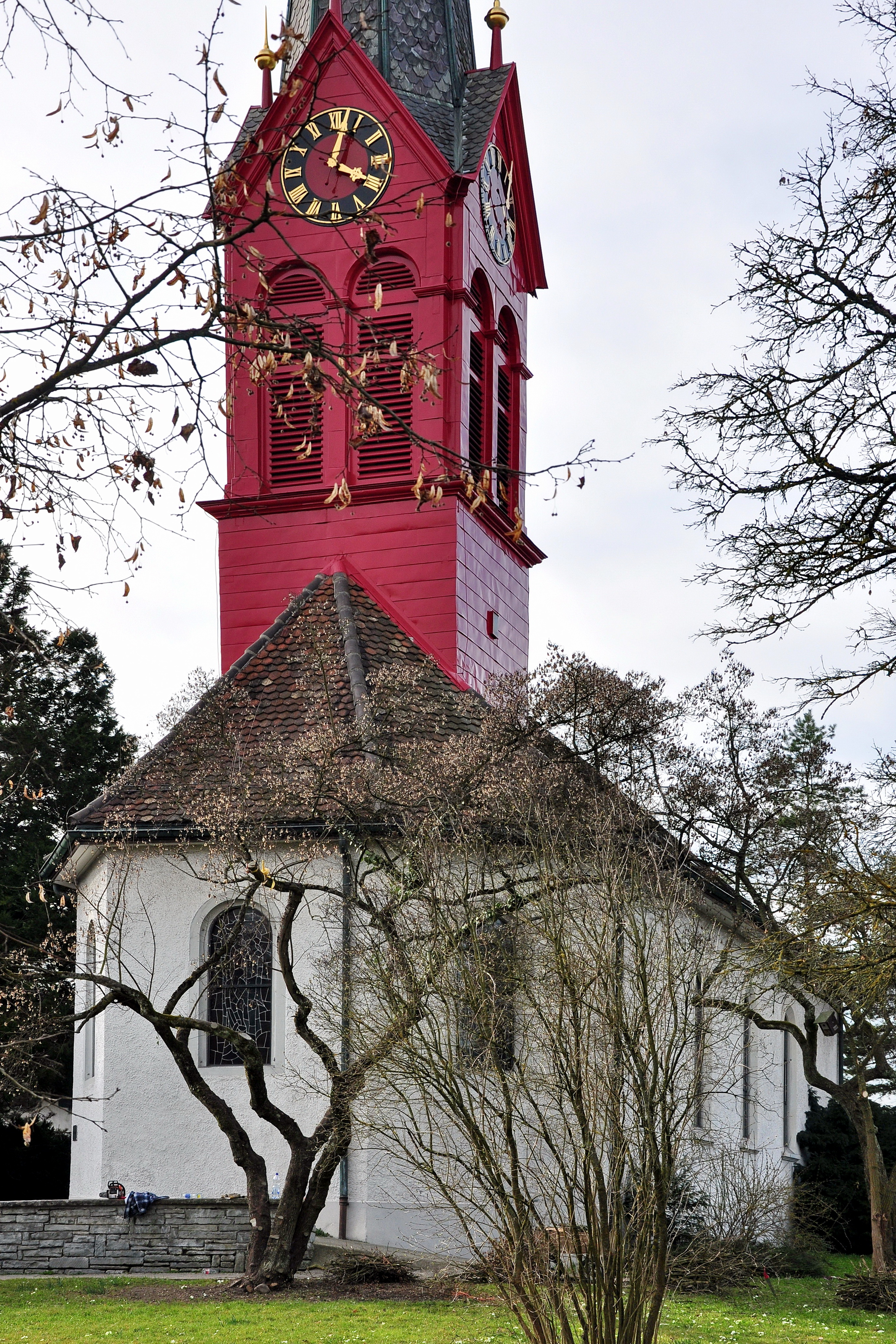
Reformed church

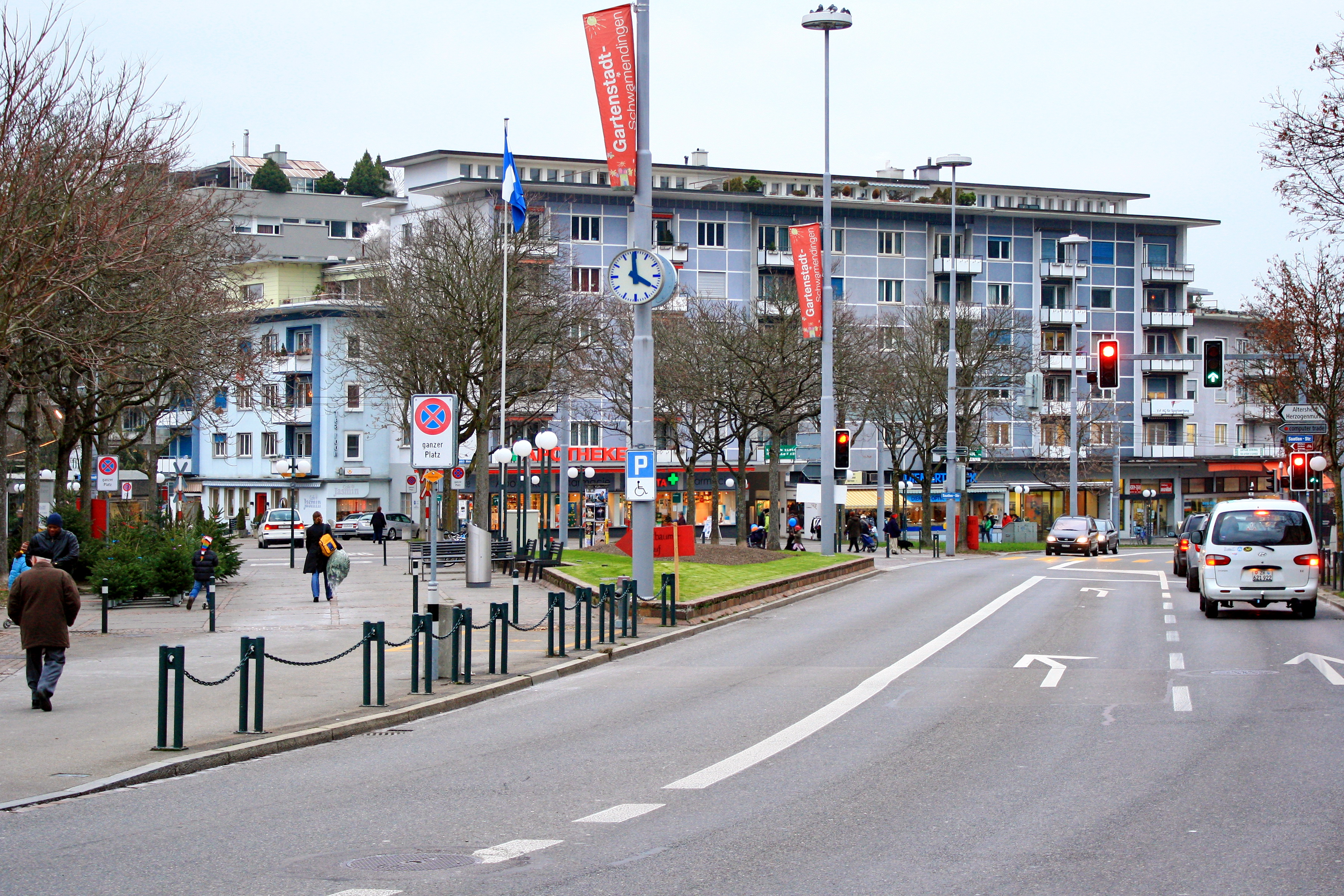
Schwamendingerplatz, Restaurant Hirschen to the left (December 2009)

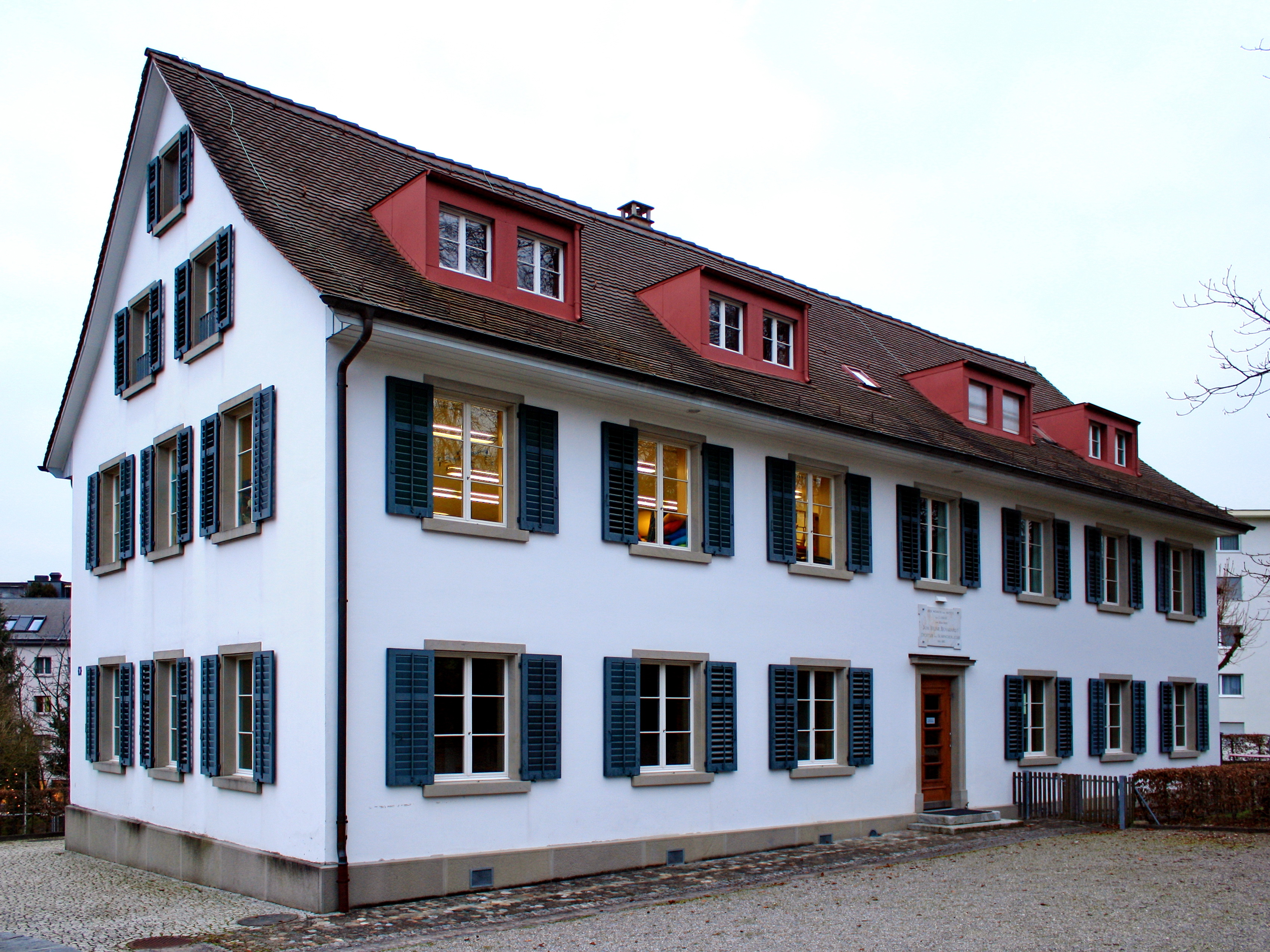
Heinrich Bosshardt school building

Schwamendingen Mitte (Schwamendingen centre) is a quarter in the district 12 in Zürich, located in the Glatt Valley (German: Glattal).

Schwamendingen and Oerlikon became independent municipalities in 1872. These were incorporated into the city of Zürich in 1934, together with Seebach, Affoltern, Witikon, Höngg, Altstetten and Albisrieden. After 1934 Schwamendingen was divided into the quarters Schwamendingen Mitte, Saatlen and Hirzenbach. As of 2025, the quarter has a population of 11,314 distributed over an area of 2.79 km^{2} (1.08 sq mi).
