= Schwamendingen =

Schwamendingen District of the city of Zürich
- District
- Flag Coat of arms

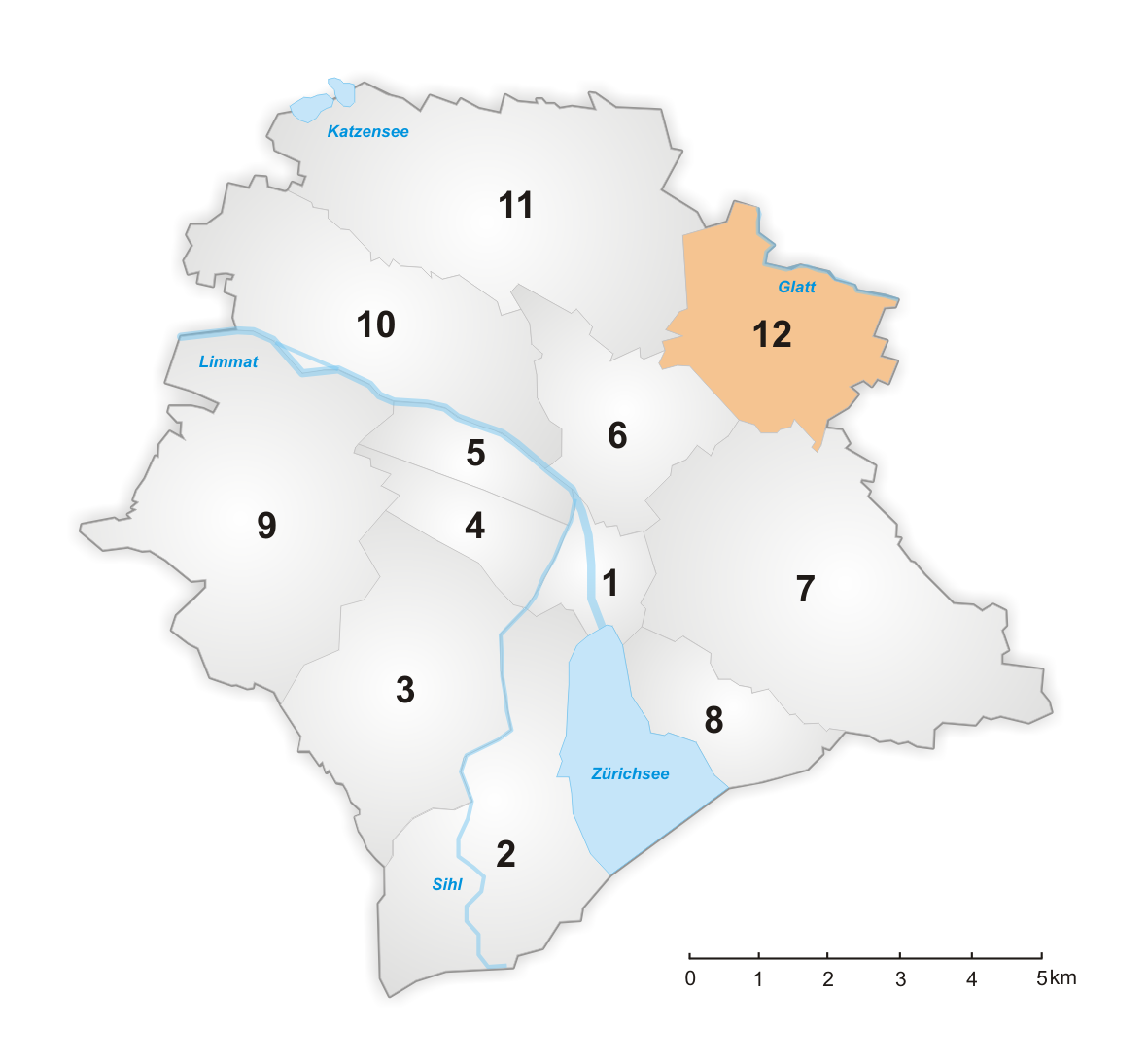
- Coordinates: 47.406°N 8.572°E
- Country: Switzerland
- Canton: Zürich
- City: Zürich

Area
  - Total: 5.97 km^{2} (2.31 sq mi)

Population (31. Dec. 2005)
  - Total: 28,314
  - Density: 4,743/km^{2} (12,280/sq mi)
- District Number: 12
- Quarters: Schwamendingen Mitte; Saatlen; Hirzenbach

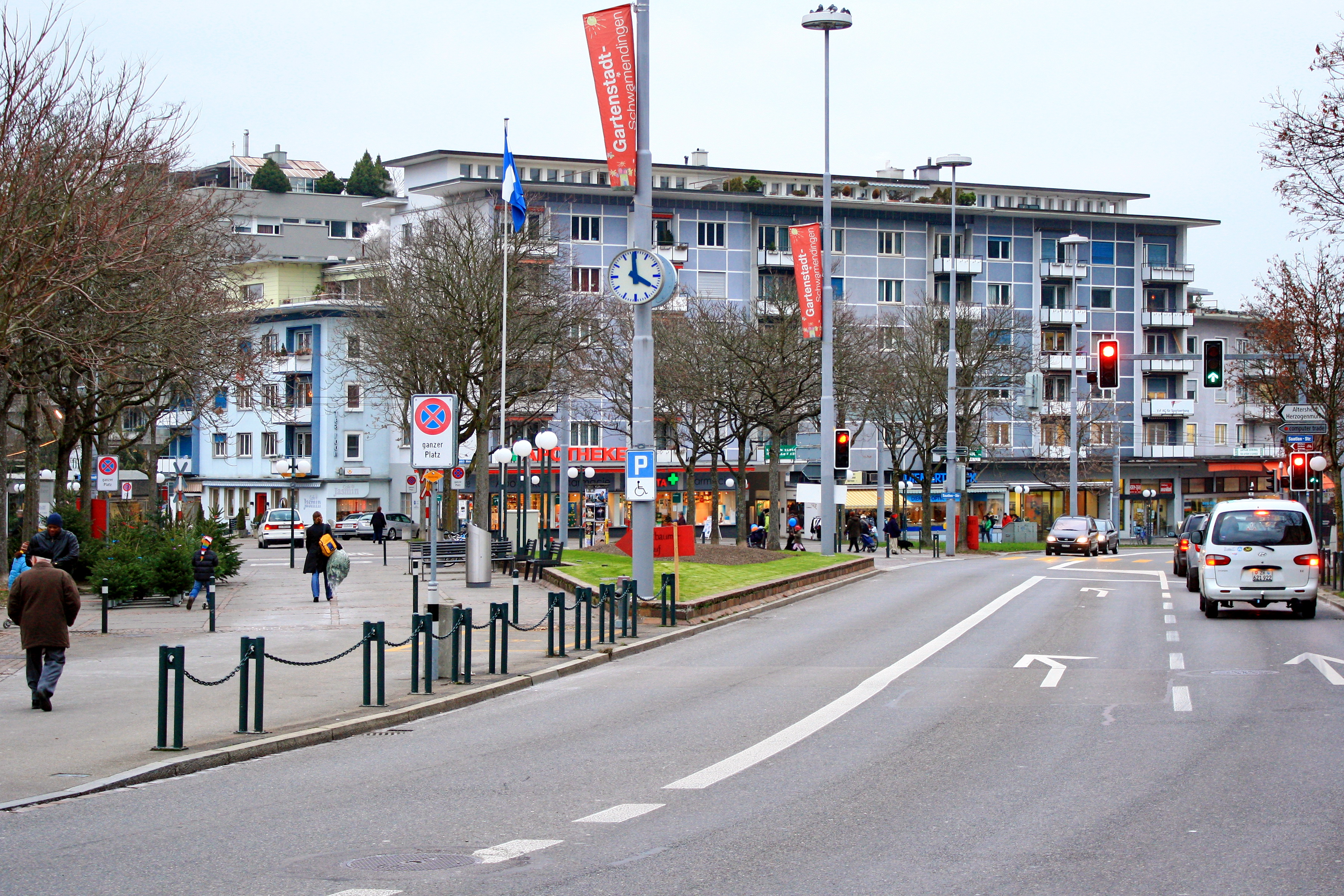
Schwamendingerplatz (December 2009)

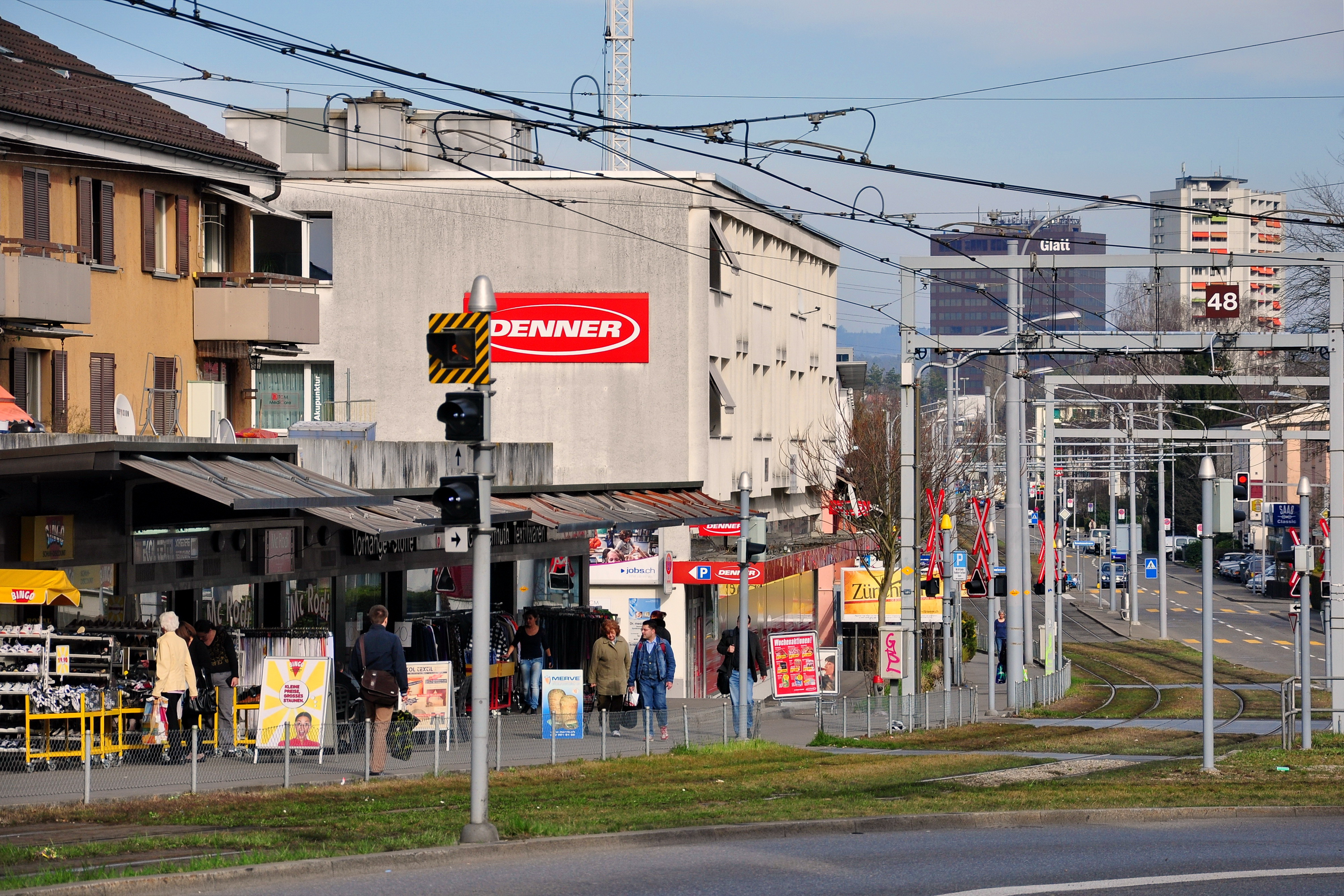
Winterthurerstrasse as seen from Schwamendingerplatz, Glattzentrum in Wallisellen in the background

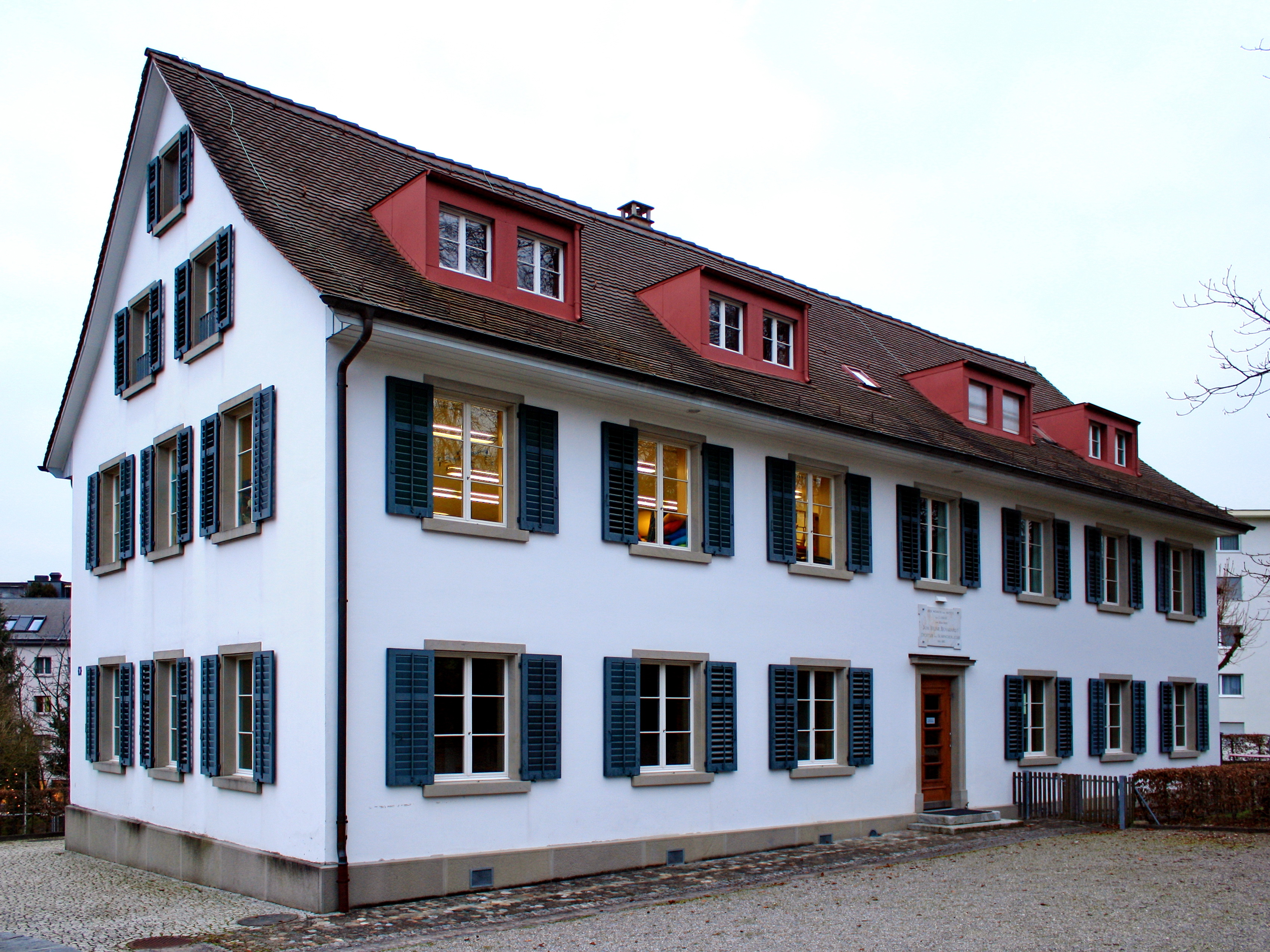
Heinrich Bosshardt school building

Aerial view from 200 m by Walter Mittelholzer (1919)

Schwamendingen is a district in the Swiss city of Zürich. Formerly an independent community, it was incorporated into Zurich in 1934 to build district number 12.

The district comprises the quarters Schwamendingen Mitte, Saatlen and Hirzenbach. The district numbers 11 and 12, both based in Glatt Valley, are commonly referred to as Zurich North.

== History ==
Schwamendingen was an Alemannic settlement, named after one Swuamund, archaeologically attested from the 5th century. The settlement was given to the Grossmünster in the 9th century after the death of its last Alemannic owner, Picho son of Ertilo. The settlement is recorded as consisting of ten houses in 915. The Grossmünster presented the village with a church bell in 1461. During the Swiss Reformation, the first Protestant pastor in Schwammendingen, Hans Schmid, took office in 1526. Schwamendingen and Oerlikon became independent municipalities in 1872. These were incorporated into the city of Zürich in 1934, together with Seebach, Affoltern, Witikon, Höngg, Altstetten and Albisrieden.

== Population ==
Schwamendingen counts a population of approximately 32,500 people. With a foreign immigration population of 37%, it's above the city-wide average of 30%, most likely relating to the relatively low cost of living with a large portion coming particularly from Turkey, Eritrea, Somalia, Syria, Congo, Tunisia and Sri Lanka.

== Traffic ==
The A1 motorway crosses Schwamendingen. In 2006 and 2011, the city, canton and country have agreed to loans being used for a 900m long enclosure, aiming to decrease the noise and air pollution in the community.

Tram numbers 7 and 9 are connected to Schwamendingen, as well as bus lines 61, 62, 75, 79, 94 and 787.

The Stettbach railway station is situated in the eastern part of Schwamendingen, near Dübendorf.
