= Hirzenbach =

Quarter of the city of Zurich, Switzerland

Coordinates: 47°24′16.66″N 8°35′14.31″E

- Quarter of Zurich
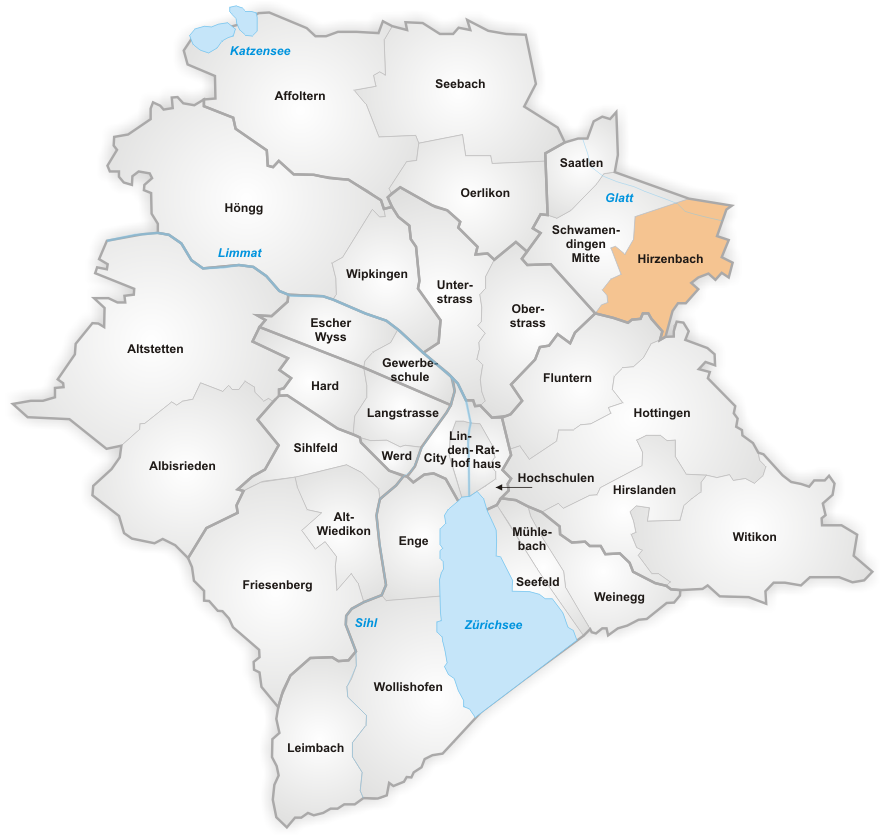
- The quarter of Hirzenbach in Zürich
- Country: Switzerland
- Canton: Zurich
- Municipality: Zurich
- District: Schwamendingen

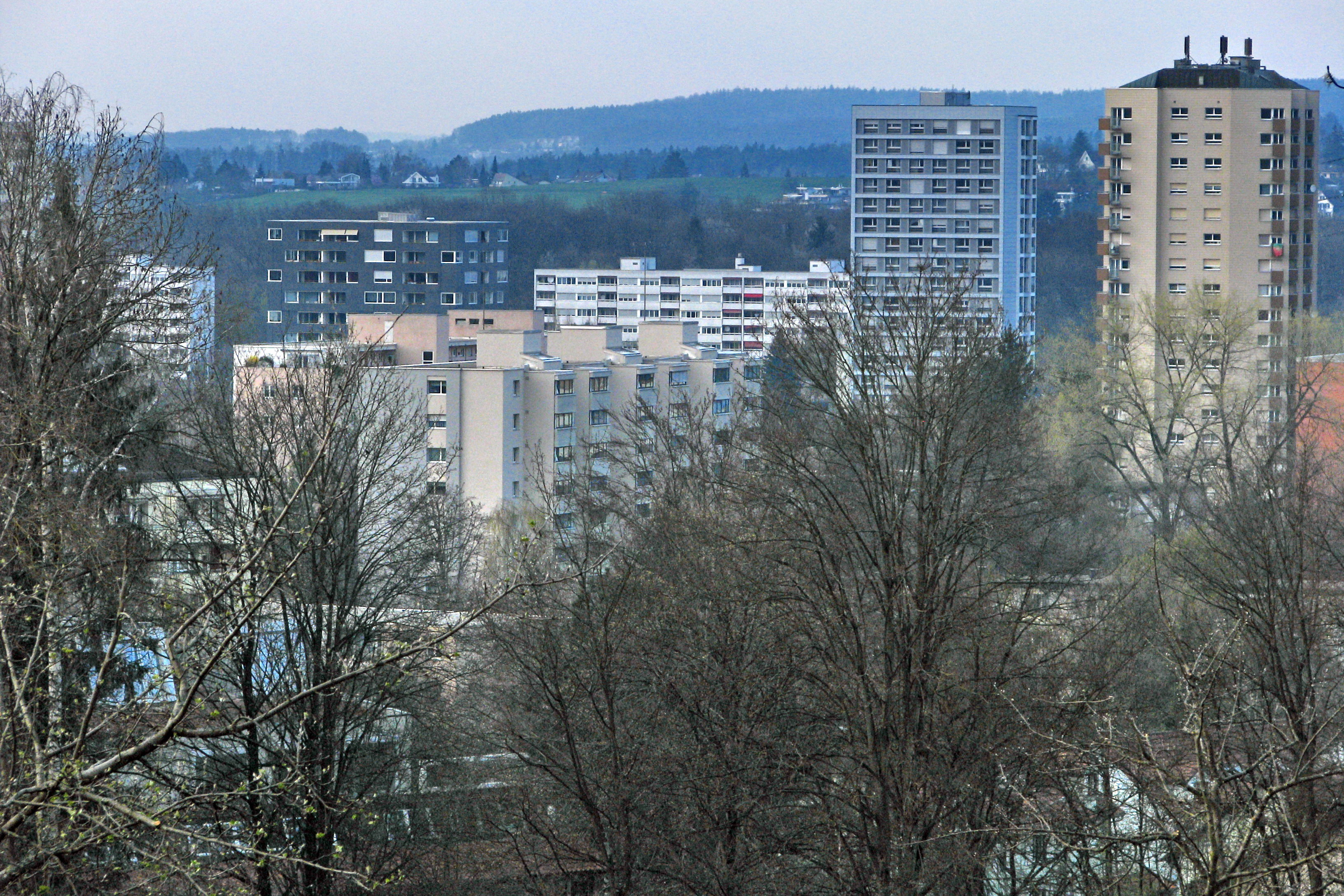
Apartment buildings in Hirzenbach as seen from Sagentobel valley on Adlisberg (April 2010)

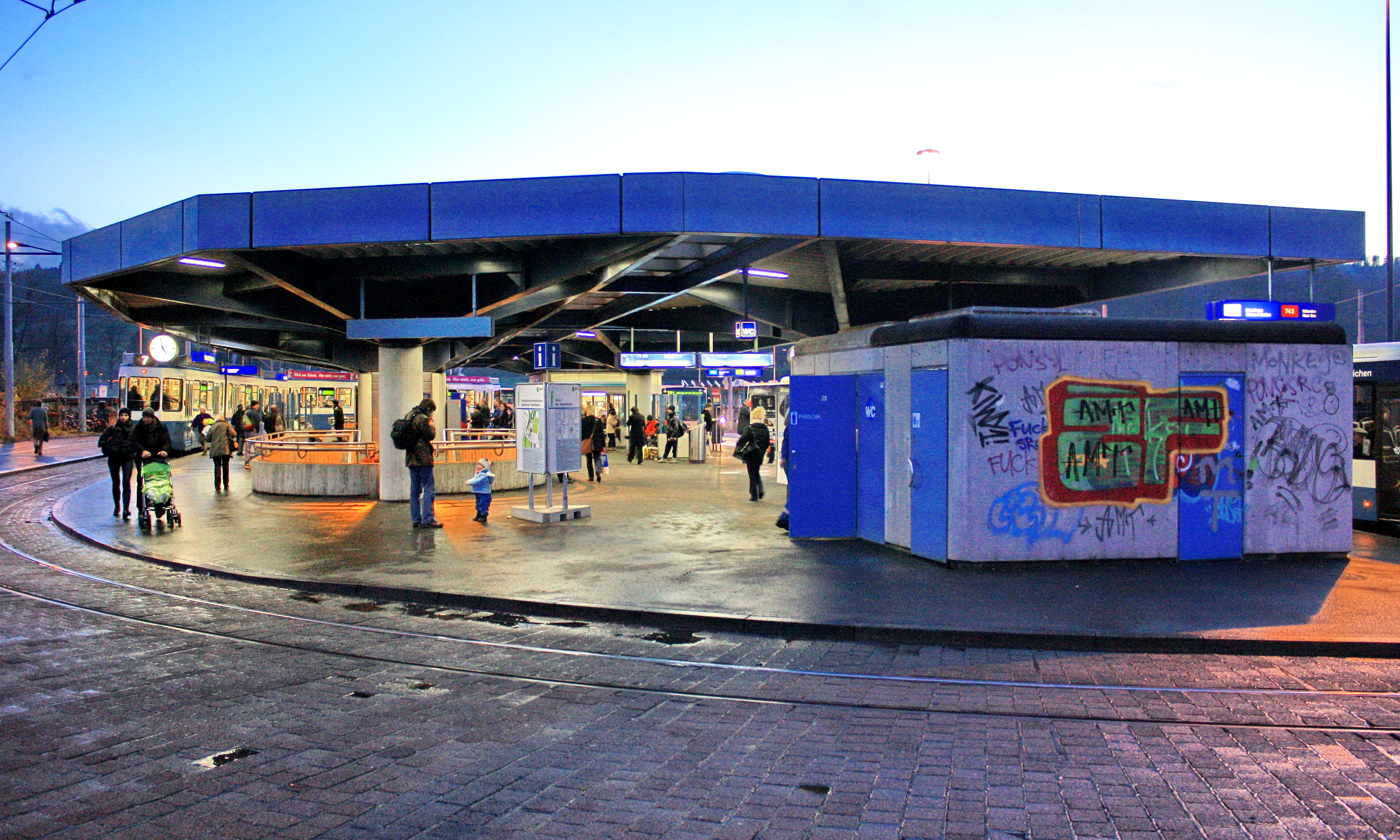
Stettbach S-Bahn Zürich train station (December 2009)

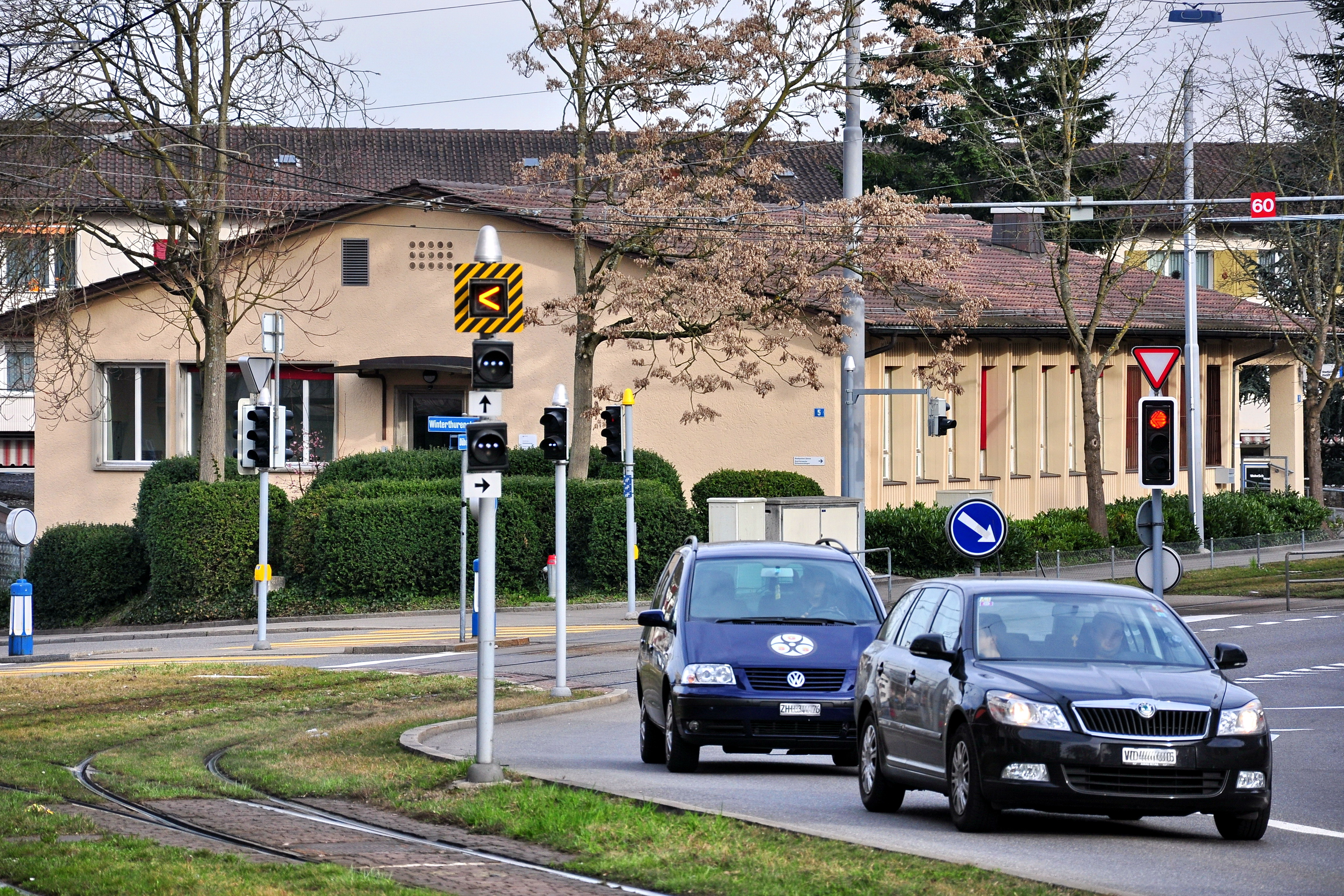
Winterthurerstrasse towards Stettbach respectively Dübendorf as seen from Schwamendingen Mitte (December 2009)

Hirzenbach is a quarter in the district 12 of Zürich, located in the Glatt Valley (German: Glattal).

It was part of Schwamendingen municipality that was amalgamated into Zürich in 1934.

As of 2025, the quarter has a population of 12,743 distributed on an area of 2.046 km^{2} (0.790 sq mi).
