= Werd (Zürich) =

Quarter of the city of Zurich, Switzerland

- Quarter of Werd in Aussersihl, Zürich
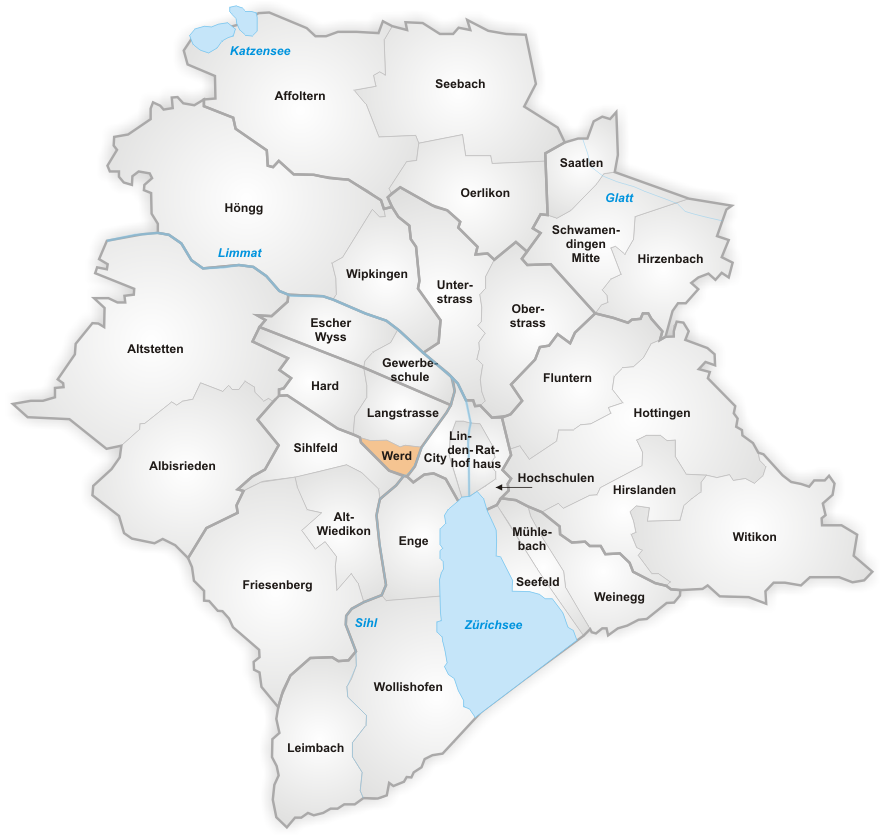
- The Quarter of Werd in Aussersihl, Zürich
- Interactive map of Werd
- Coordinates: 47°22′16.41″N 8°31′41.33″E
- Country: Switzerland
- Canton: Zürich
- District: District 4, Aussersihl
- Postal Code: 8004
- Kreis 4: 1913

Area
  - Total: 0.31 km^{2} (0.12 sq mi)

Dimensions
  - Length: .6 km (0.37 mi)
  - Width: .8 km (0.50 mi)
- Elevation: 410 m (1,350 ft)

Population (2012)
  - Total: 4,186
- German Wikipedia Version
- Time zone: UTC+1 (CET)
- ISO 3166 code: CH-ZH
- Vehicle registration: ZH ######
- Website: Kreis 4

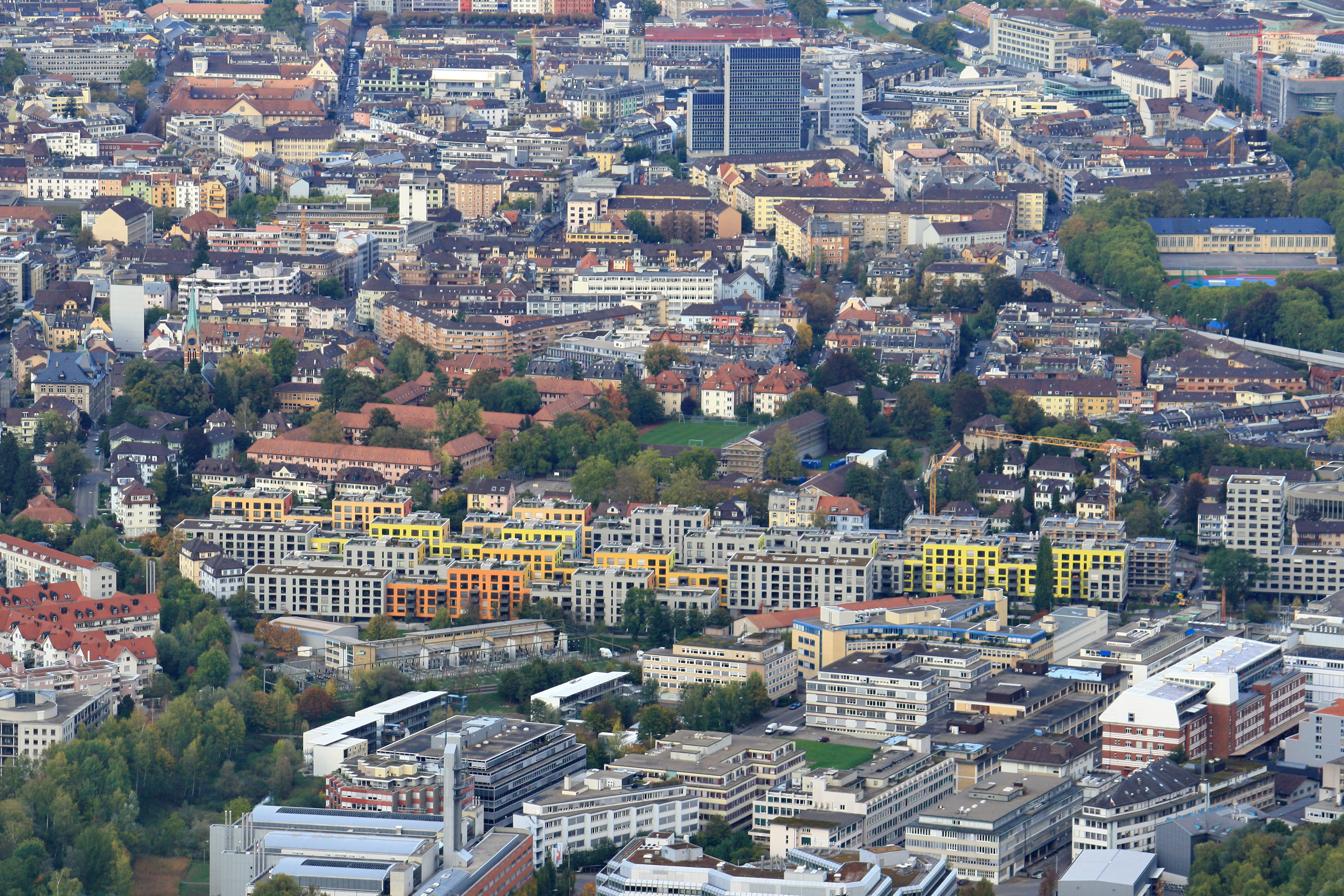
Werd and Friesenberg (in the foreground) as seen from Uetliberg (October 2009)

Werd is a quarter in district 4, Aussersihl in Zürich, Switzerland. The three quarters of district 4, Aussersihl are Werd, Langstrasse and Hard.

Werd is the southernmost quarter of district 4 and it borders with the Langstrasse, Quarter of district 4 to the north; the City Quarter of district 1, Altstadt to the east; the Sihlfeld Quarter of district 3, Wiedikon to the west, and the Enge Quarter of district 2, West side of the Lake to the south.

Werd (an old German word for river island) was formerly a municipality of Aussersihl, having been incorporated into Zürich in 1893. The separation into the current districts 3, 4 and 5 dates to 1913.

Werdinsel refers to the name of the district, but it is a Limmat island situated in Zürich-Höngg.

== Gallery ==
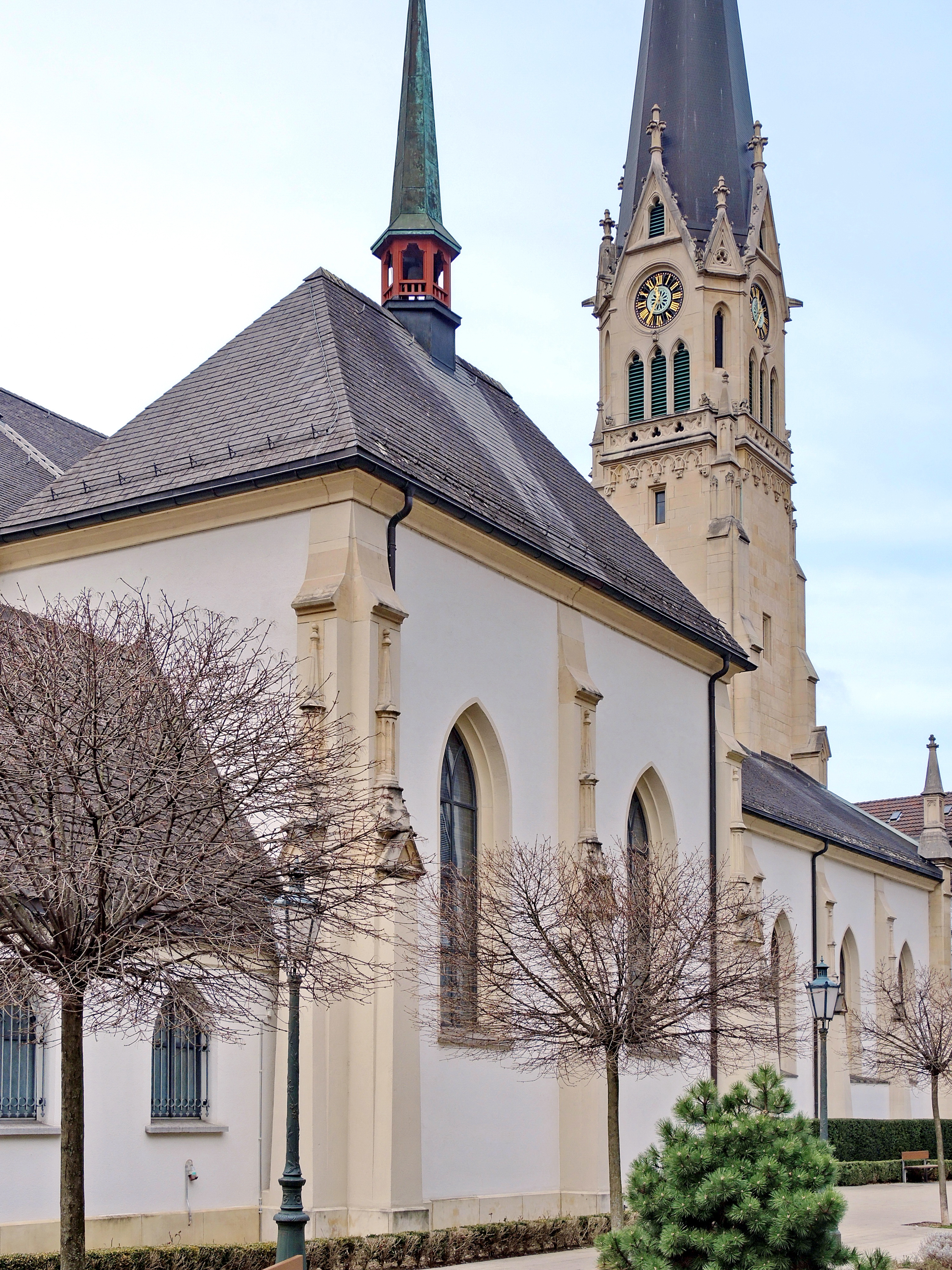
St. Peter and Paul church nearby Stauffacher

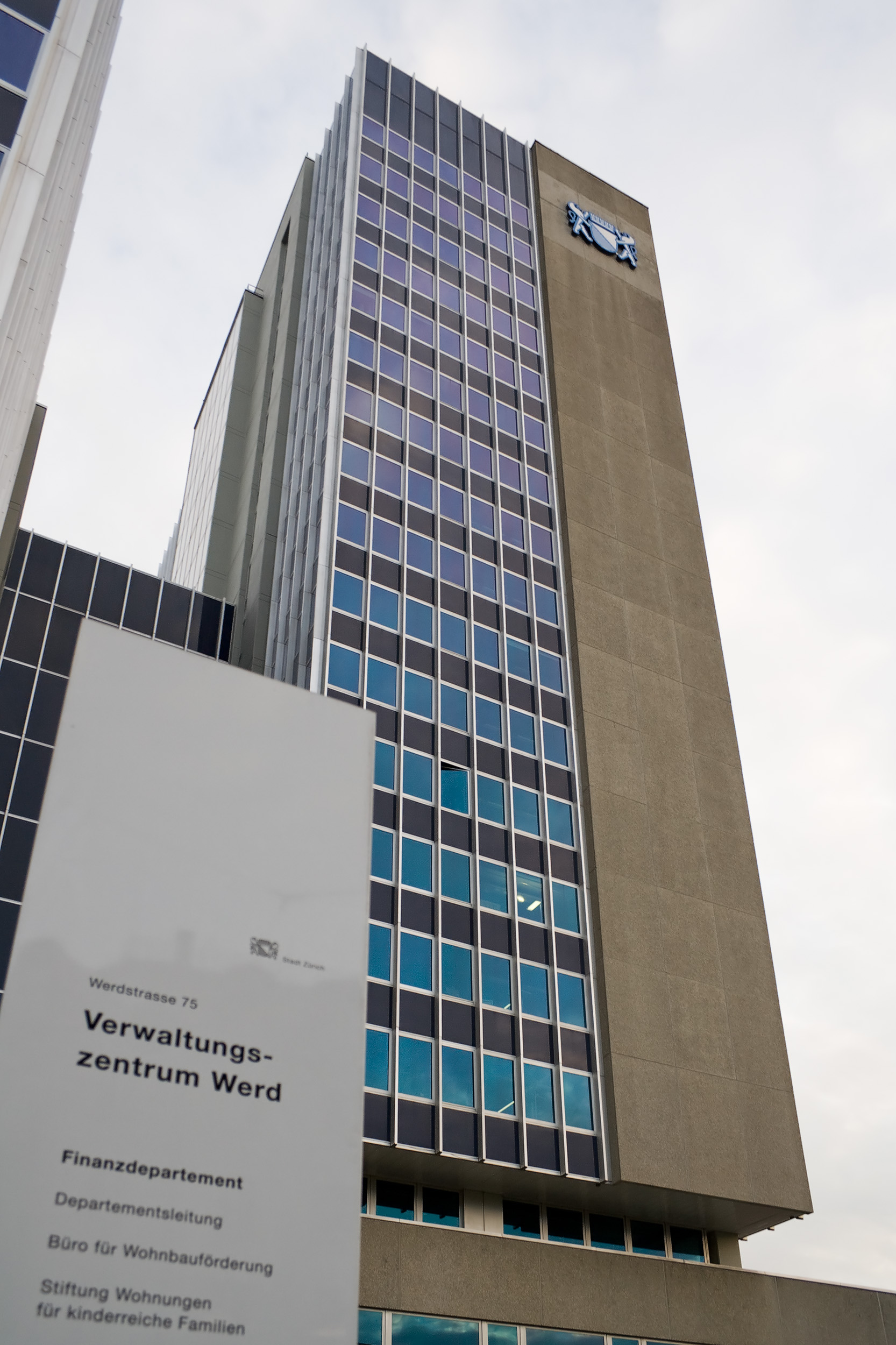
Werdhochhaus, administration building of the City of Zürich
