= List of annual events in Zurich =

List of major annual events in Zürich, Switzerland, by month.

Month	Event	Type	Location	Year first run
January	International Horse Show	Sports	Hallenstadion	1988
February	Art on Ice	Sports	Hallenstadion	1995
March	Giardina	Fair	Messe Zürich	
March	ZüriCarneval	Festival	Zurich	
April	Zurich Marathon	Sports	Greater Zurich Area	
April	Zurich spring festival	Festival	City centre to Sechseläutenplatz	
May	Mobile Motion Film Festival	Festival	Arthouse Uto	2015
June	Zurich Festival	Festival	Tonhalle, Opernhaus	
June	Zurich Pride Festival	Festival	Turbinenplatz	
July	Caliente	Festival	Helvetiaplatz	
July	Live at Sunset Festival	Festival	Dolder Eisbahn	1996
July	Züri Triathlon	Sports	Zurich	
July	Urban Festival	Festival	Puls 5	
August	Energy	Festival	Hallenstadion	1992
August	Street Parade	Festival	Lake Zurich (Bellevueplatz, Quaibrücke)	1992
August	Weltklasse Zürich	Sports	Letzigrund	
August	Zürcher Theater Spektakel	Theater	Landiwiese	1980
August	Zurich Limmat Swimming Race	Sports	Stadthausquai	
August	Niederdorf old town festival	Festival	Niederdorf	
August	Langstrasse Festival	Festival	Langstrasse	
September	Zurich Film Festival	Festival	Niederdorfstasse	2005
September	Freestyle.ch	Sports	Landiwiese	
September	Knabenschiessen	Shooting	Albisgüetli	
October	Art International Zurich	Fair	Kongresshaus	
October	Jazznojazz	Festival	Theaterhaus	
October	Zürichsee Festival	Festival	Zollikon	
October	Swiss Cup Zürich	Sports	Hallenstadion	
November	Zürich Car Show	Fair	Messe Zürich	
November	Kunst Zürich	Fair	ABB-Halle 550	
November	Zurich Six-Day-Race	Sports	Hallenstadion	
December	Christmas Market	Fair	Old Town	
December	New Year's Magic	Festival	Lake Zurich	
December	New Year's run	Sports	Zurich	

== See also ==
- Culture of Zürich
