= Helvetiaplatz =

Helvetiaplatz may refer to several squares named after Helvetia in Switzerland:

- in Basel; see Helvetiaplatz (Basel)
- in Bern; see Helvetiaplatz (Bern)
- in Luzern; see Helvetiaplatz (Luzern)
- in Zurich; see Helvetiaplatz (Zurich)
