= Seebach (Zürich) =

Quarter of the city of Zurich, Switzerland

- Quarter
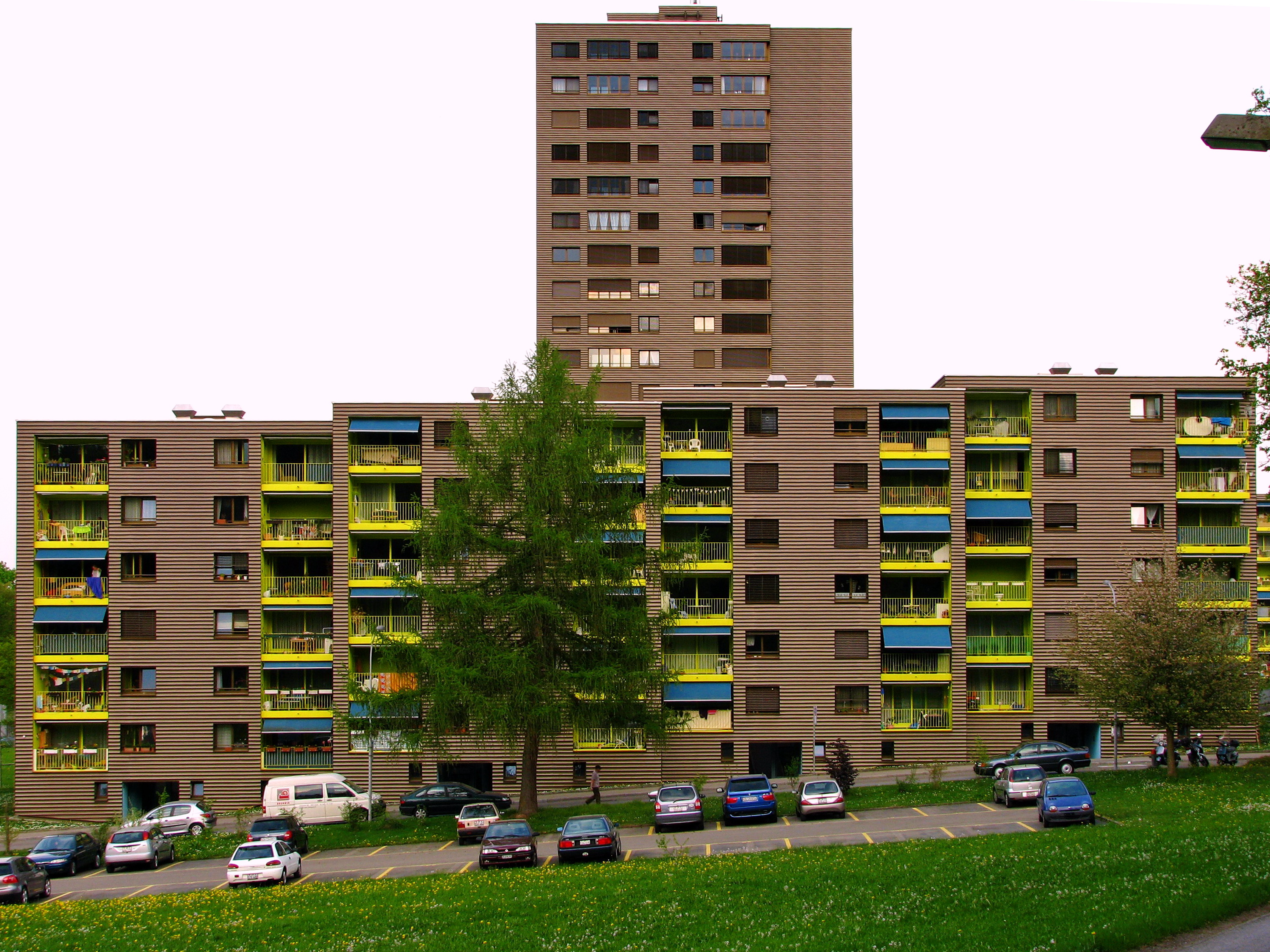
- Schwandenholz (Seebach)

- Flag Coat of arms

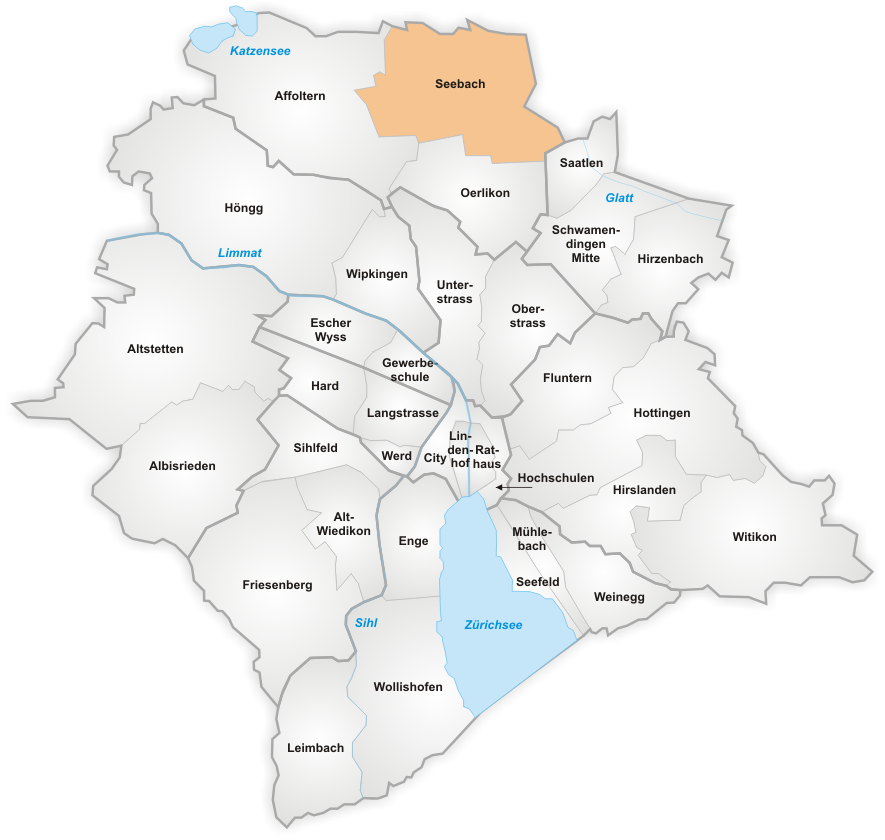
- The quarter of Seebach in Zurich
- Coordinates: 47°25′18″N 8°32′18″E
- Country: Switzerland
- Canton: Zurich
- City: Zurich
- District: 6

Seebach (German pronunciation: [ˈzeːbax]) is a quarter in the district 11 of Zürich, located in the Glatt Valley (German: Glattal).

It was formerly a municipality in its own right, but was incorporated into the city of Zürich in 1934. In contrast to the inner-city neighborhoods, Zürich-Seebach is known as an area with a vast number of immigrants, in particular from Kosovo and Macedonia, but also from Turkey, Somalia, Syria, Eritrea, Bosnia and Sri Lanka. The area is also known for some social housing projects. Areas with similar ethnic compositions exist in suburban areas around Zürich as well, like Schlieren or Dietikon where immigrants form the majority of the population.

As of 2025, the quarter has a population of 28,336 distributed on an area of 4.71 km^{2} (1.82 sq mi).

== Transportation ==
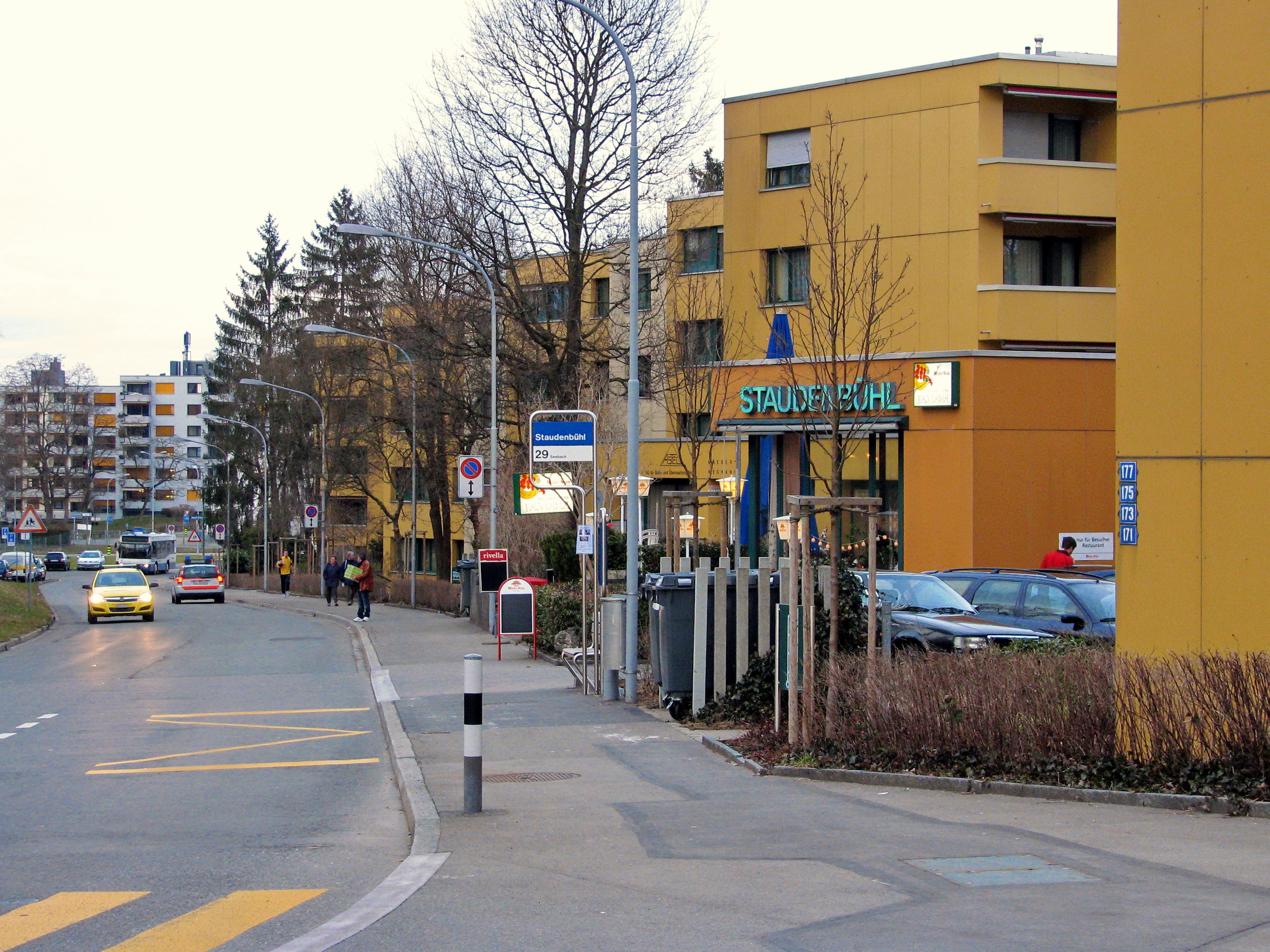
Apartments in Seebach

Aerial view (1947)

Zürich Seebach railway station is a stop on service S6 of the Zürich S-Bahn, which provides a half-hourly connection to Zürich Oerlikon and Zürich Hauptbahnhof stations, taking respectively 5 and 12 minutes for the journey. The quarter is also linked to central Zürich by line 14 of the Zürich tram system, which provides a more frequent but slower service than the S-Bahn.

== Notable people ==
- Ernst Sieber (born 1927), pastor, social worker, writer and former politician who founded Sozialwerke Pfarrer Sieber
- Bruno Ganz (born 1941), Swiss actor born in Seebach.
