= Hornstaad culture =

Neolithic ceramic style, c. 3900 BC

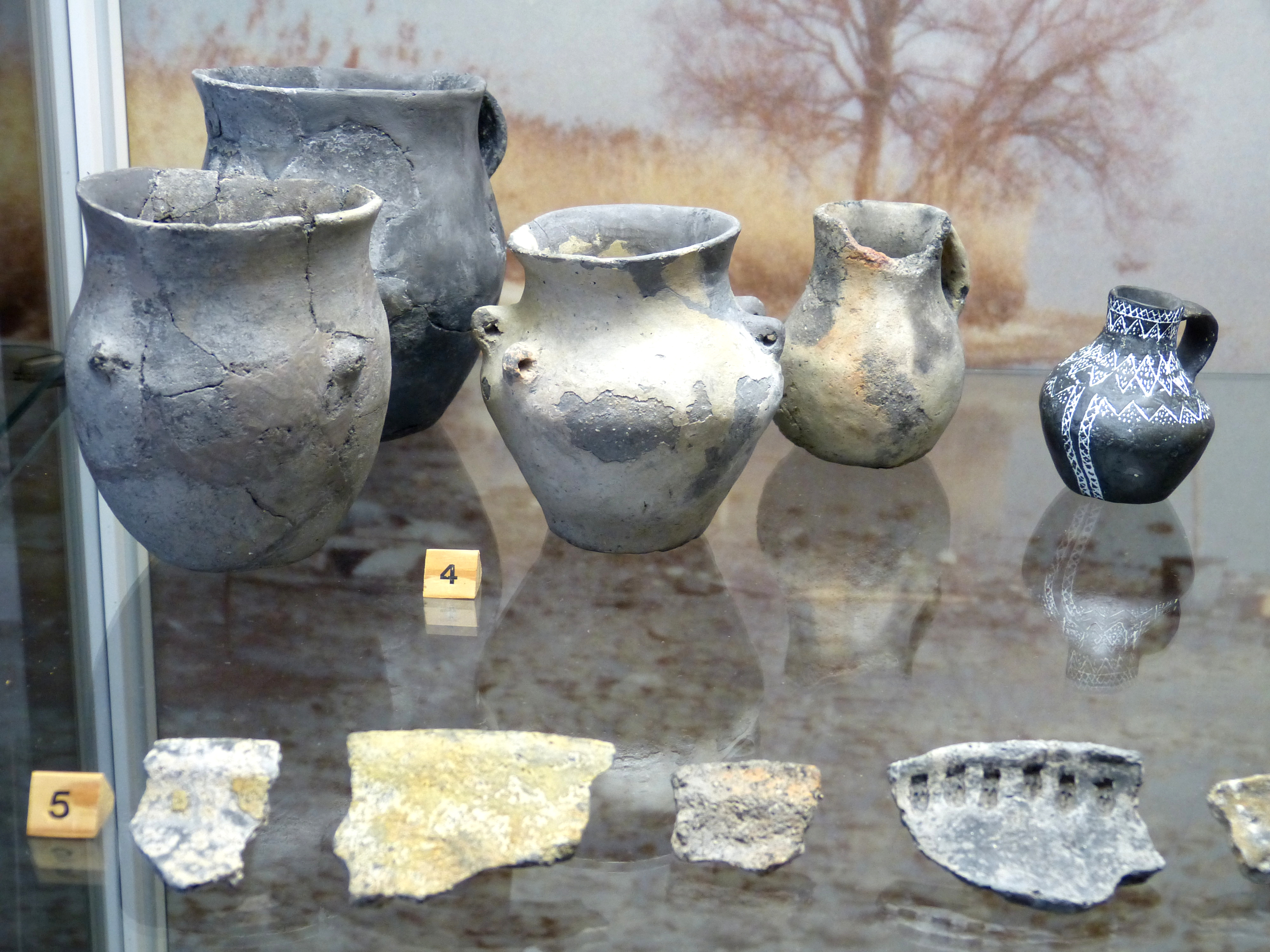
Vessels from Hornstaad-Hörnle at the Gaienhofen Museum

The Hornstaad culture (also Hornstaad style) is a Neolithic ceramic group or style dating to around 3900 BC (Jungneolithikum), named after the eponymous site of Hornstaad – Hörnle IA in the German municipality of Gaienhofen, on the shore of the Lower Lake Constance.

The settlements of Hornstaad – Hörnle IA (3918–3902 BC) and Sipplingen – Osthafen A (3919–3904 BC), occupied for short periods and well dated by dendrochronology, yielded most of the ceramic material of this style. Some vessels found at Eschenz – Insel Werd (layer III, complex A), probably mixed with more recent material, may have been produced in the Hornstaad style on the basis of the typological parallels they present, and could thus date from before 3900 BC. The pottery of the Pfyn culture (3900–3500 BC) developed from that of Hornstaad.

== Material culture ==
The material of the Hornstaad group consists of thin-walled vessels, always with flat bases. Characteristic forms are S-profiled jars with a marked shoulder, sometimes with a small knob, bottles with a conical lower belly, handles arranged in a crown and a pronounced angular shoulder, as well as jugs with a sometimes sharply angular shoulder and a pair of knobs in the area below the neck.

Rounded bowls, pots and small vessels are also found, along with conical bowls bearing a herringbone motif in the Lutzengüetle style. Some vessels showing characteristics of other styles attest to contacts with neighboring regions such as Federsee, Lake Zurich and Baden-Württemberg / Upper Rhine, notably a jug decorated with engraved ornament in the Schussenried style, S-profiled jars with knobs under the rim, and vases in the Michelsberg style.

Besides ceramics, stone axes (of the Aichbühl type) are also characteristic. Sickles of the Riedschachen type and discoid limestone beads likewise indicate links with the Schussenried culture in the Federsee marsh.

== Settlements ==
The lakeshore settlements, located on the periodically flooded lake terraces, comprised numerous houses. While those at Hornstaad – Hörnle IA appear to have been built in a relatively loose arrangement and to follow various orientations, the houses of the contemporary village of Sipplingen – Osthafen A, set close together and generally parallel to the shore, indicate a different organization.

== Bibliography ==
- Stöckli, Werner E.: Chronologie und Regionalität des jüngeren Neolithikums (4300–2400 v.Chr.) im Schweizer Mittelland, in Süddeutschland und in Ostfrankreich aufgrund der Keramik und der absoluten Datierungen, ausgehend von den Forschungen in den Feuchtbodensiedlungen der Schweiz, 2009.
- Matuschik, Irenäus; Schlichtherle, Helmut: "Steter Wandel: Von Aichbühl bis zur Schnurkeramik. Pfahlbaukulturen in Südwestdeutschland", in: Archäologisches Landesmuseum Baden-Württemberg; Landesamt für Denkmalpflege im Regierungspräsidium Stuttgart (eds.): 4.000 Jahre Pfahlbauten, 2016, pp. 68–79.
- Heitz, Caroline: "Making things, being mobile. Pottery as intertwined histories of humans and materials", in: Heitz, Caroline; Stapfer, Regine (eds.): Mobility and Pottery Production. Archaeological & Anthropological Perspectives, 2017, pp. 257–292.
