= Limmat (disambiguation) =

Limmat may refer to:

- Limmat, a river in the cantons of Zürich and Aargau in Switzerland.
  - Limmat (ship, 1958), a tour boat provided by the Zürichsee-Schifffahrtsgesellschaft in Zürich.
  - Limmatauen, a protected area at the Werdinsel Limmat river island.
  - Limmatquai, a street in Zürich.
- Limmat Verlag, a publishing house in Zürich.
