= Helvetiaplatz (Zurich) =

Public square in Zurich, Switzerland

Coordinates: 47.376130°N 8.52691°E

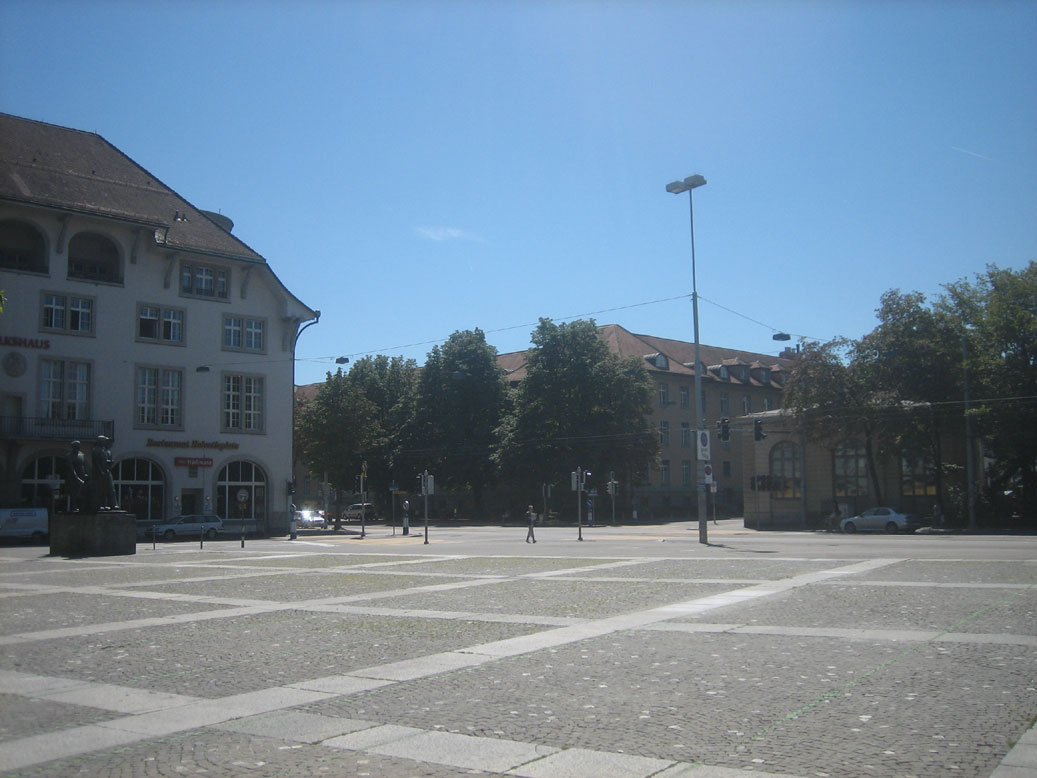
The square and Volkshaus (left) in 2007

The Helvetiaplatz (lit. 'Helvetia square') is a public square located in Aussersihl (district 4) at the corner of Langstrasse and Stauffacherstrasse in Zurich. The square is known for frequently hosting a variety of demonstrations, both officially authorized and not, such as protests for 1 May (Labour Day), on environmental issues, and on geopolitical issues. Celebrations of the local football club FC Zürich also regularly take place at Helvetiaplatz.

Helvetiaplatz hosts a farmers' market every Tuesday and Friday morning between 6:00 and 11:00. In addition to local produce, a variety of imported products are sold as well.

Adjacent to the square is the Amtshaus Helvetiaplatz, a government building that houses the social welfare office for districts 3, 4, and 5 of Zurich. The historic building was originally constructed in 1963 and renovated from 2016 to 2019.

The first project of pastor Ernst Sieber's Sozialwerke Pfarrer Sieber for homeless people started at Helvetiaplatz in winter 1963; the foundation is still based in Zürich-Aussersihl. The place is well known because of demonstrations on 1 May and against the World Economic Forum. Otherwise peaceful and multicultural events or demonstrations take place there. In 2006 and 2007 there was a great champion celebration after FC Zürich won the Swiss Axpo Super League.

Directly at the Helvetiaplatz you can find the Volkshaus where there are regular events such as concerts or parties. Next to the Helvetiaplatz is the Kanzleiareal with a schoolhouse, the cultural centre called Kanzlei and the alternative cinema and bar named Xenix.

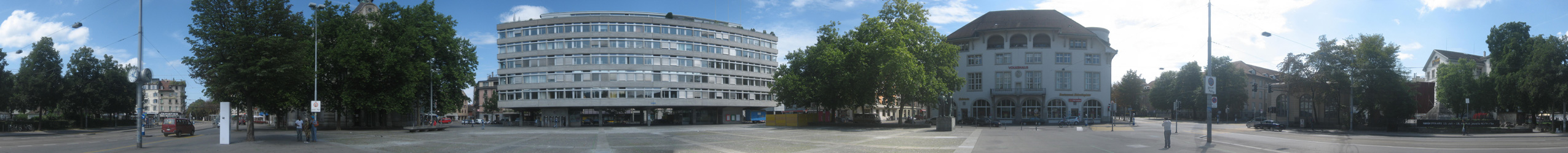
Panorama of the Helvetiaplatz with the Civil Service building (middle left), the Volkshaus (middle right) and the Kanzleiareal (right)

== Events ==
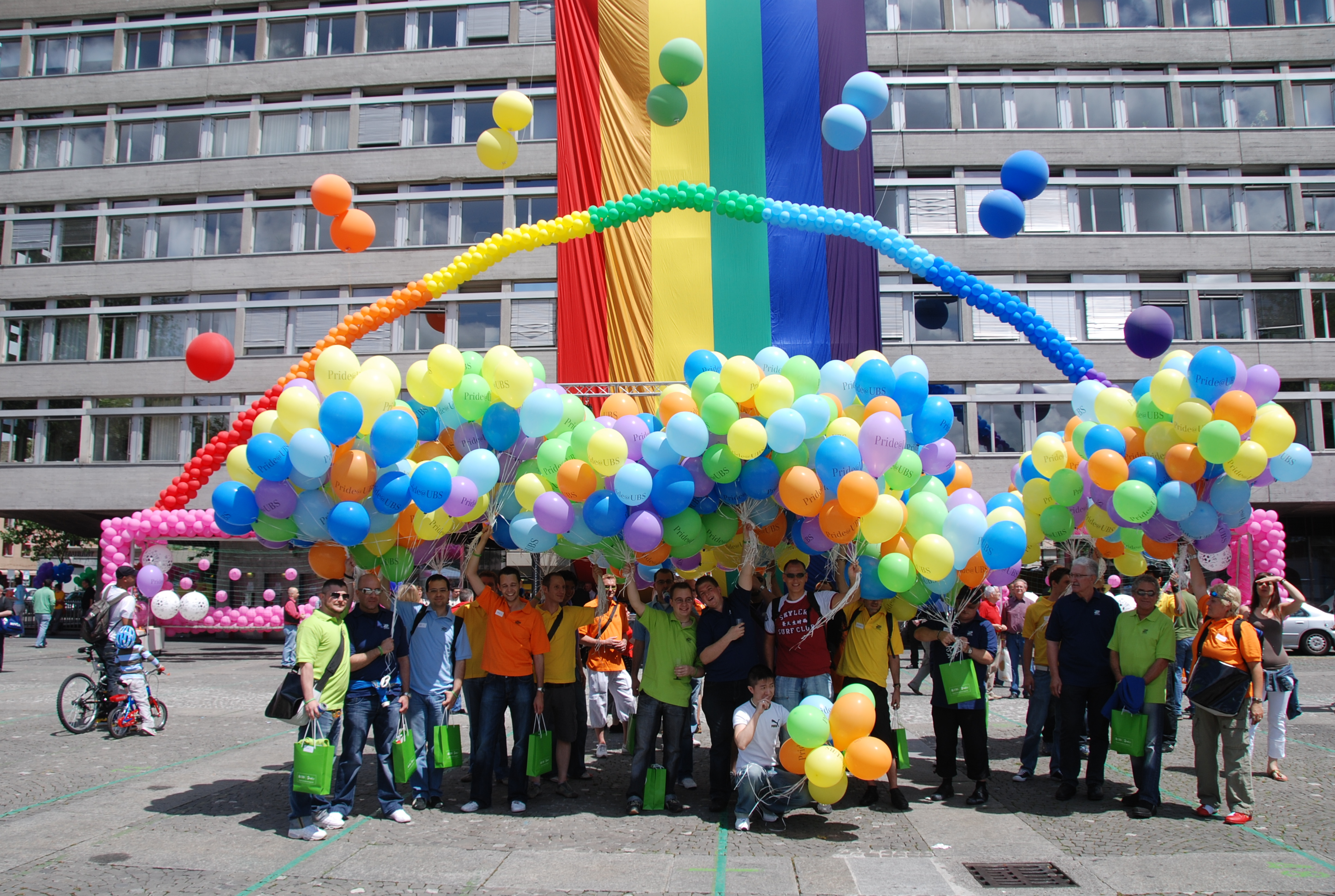
CSD in 2008

Langstrassenfest

The Langstrassenfest (lit. 'Longstreet Festival') is an important part of the Langstrasse PLUS campaign. It takes place since 1996 every two years. In 2004, it counted about 270,000 visitors. In the years without a Langstrassenfest, the Longstreet Carneval takes place. The Langstrassenfest is organised by Swiss citizens.

Longstreet Carneval

Every other year when there is no Langstrassenfest, the Longstreet Carneval takes place. This carnival is organised by non–Swiss citizens.

Caliente

The Caliente Festival is the biggest Latin Festival all over Europe. It counted over 130,000 visitors in 2006.

Open-Air-Cinema

Every summer in July and August there is an open air cinema at the cinema/bar Xenix near the Helvetiaplatz.
