= Alt-Wiedikon =

Quarter of the city of Zurich, Switzerland

- Quarter
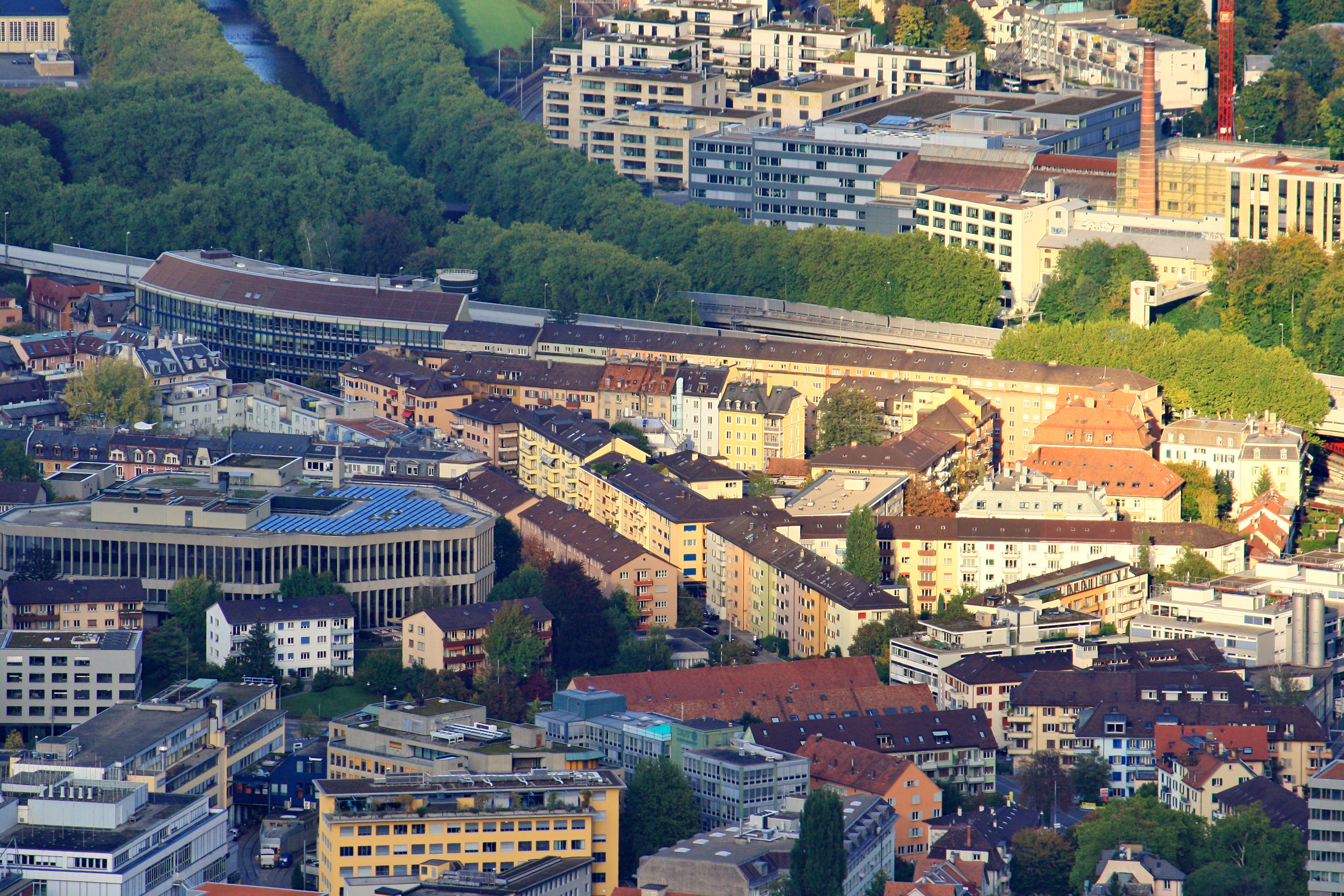
- Alt-Wiedikon as seen from Uetliberg (October 2009)

- Coat of arms

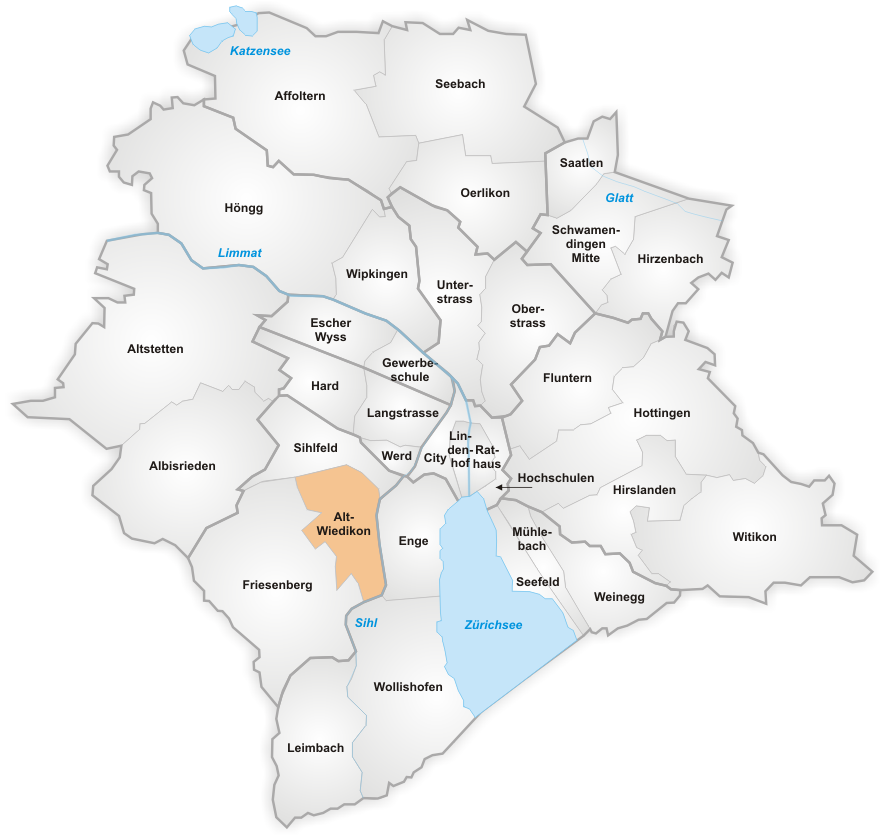
- The quarter of Alt-Wiedikon in Zurich
- Country: Switzerland
- Canton: Zurich
- Municipality: Zurich
- District: Wiedikon

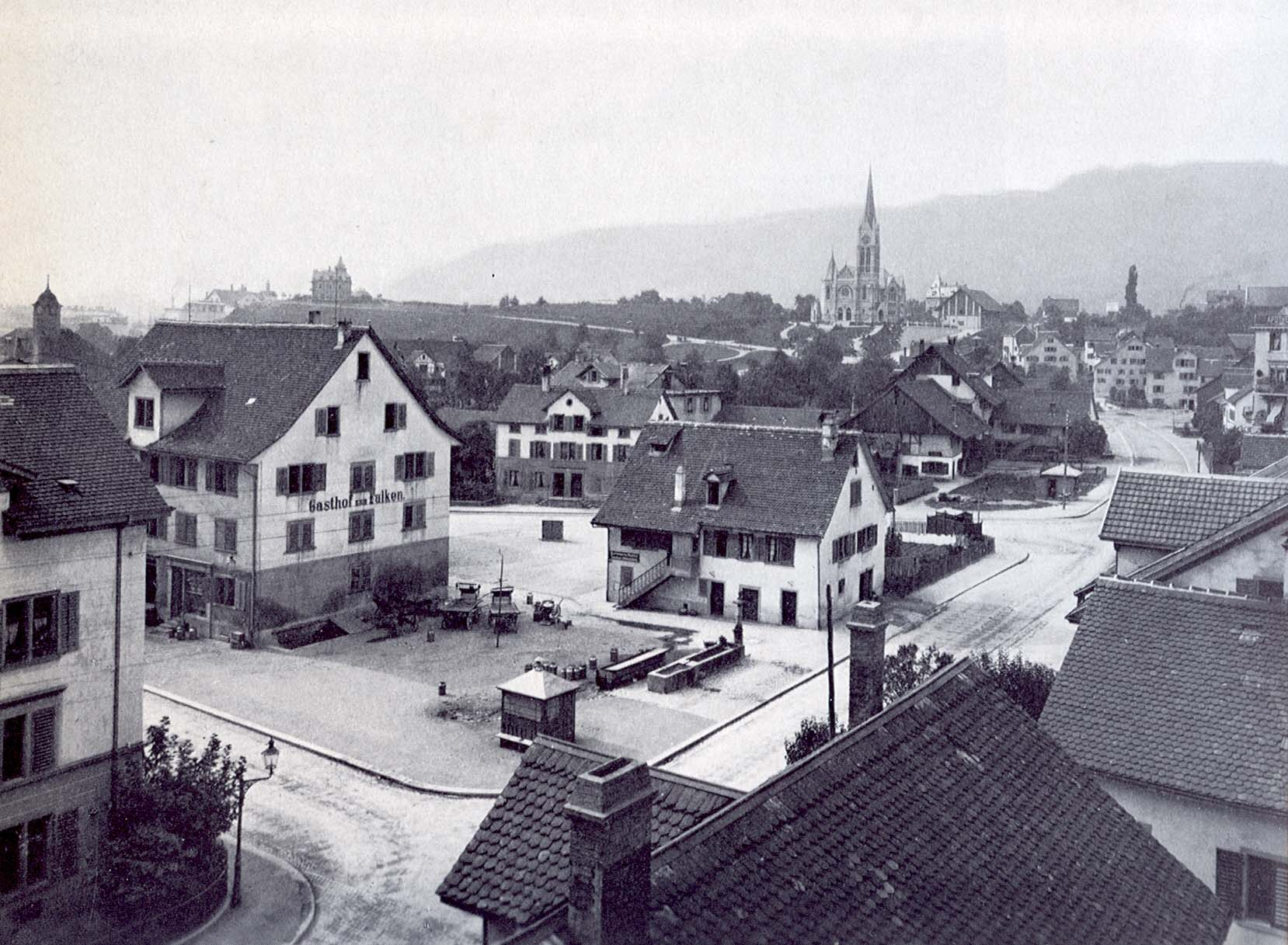
Zweierstrasse (1908)

Alt-Wiedikon is a quarter in the district 3 of Zurich.

It was formerly a part of Wiedikon municipality, which was incorporated into Zurich in 1893.

As of 2025, the quarter has a population of 18,610 distributed on an area of 1.69 km^{2} (0.65 sq mi).
