= Aussersihl =

Aussersihl District of the city of Zürich
- District
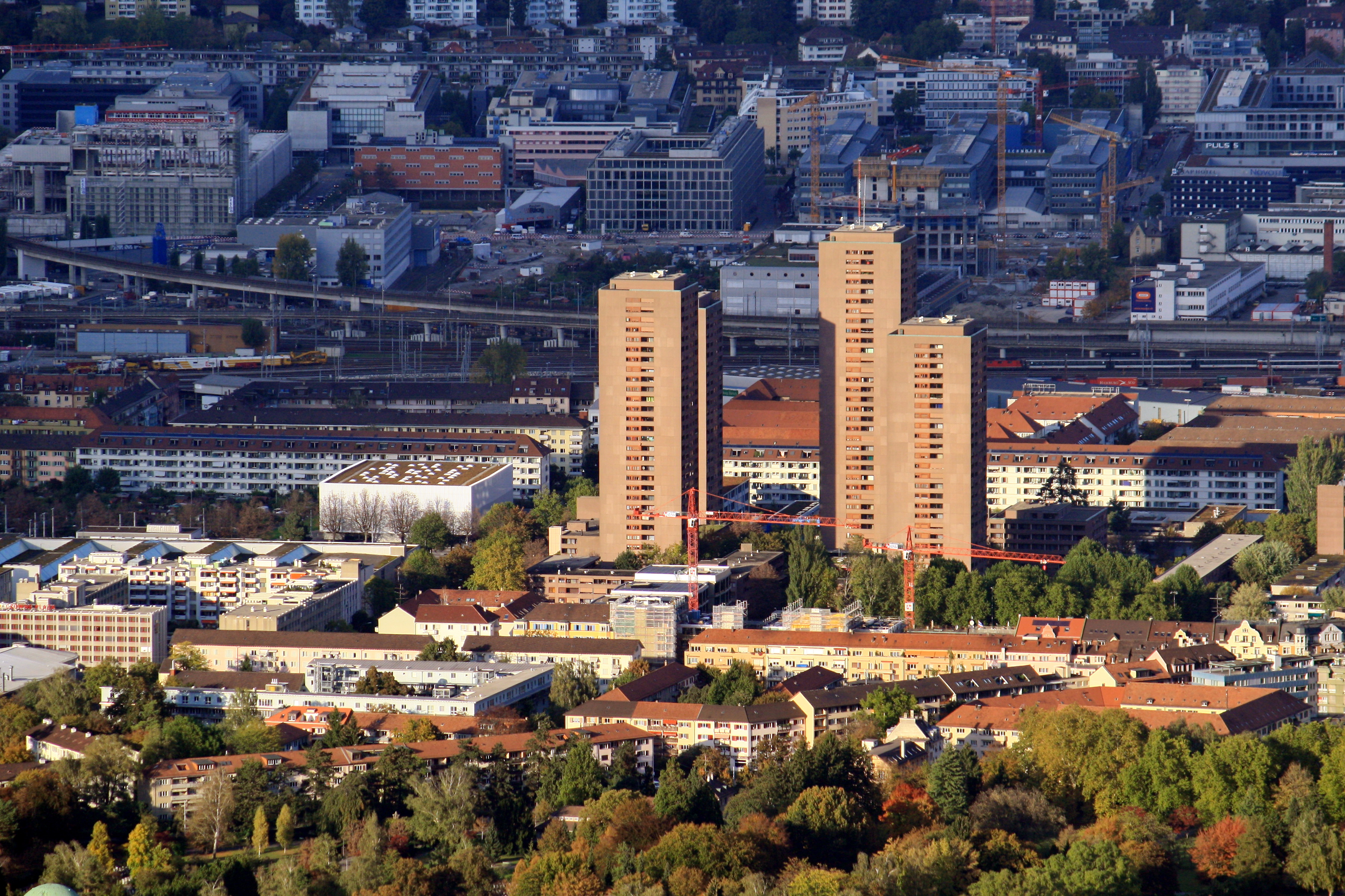

- Seal

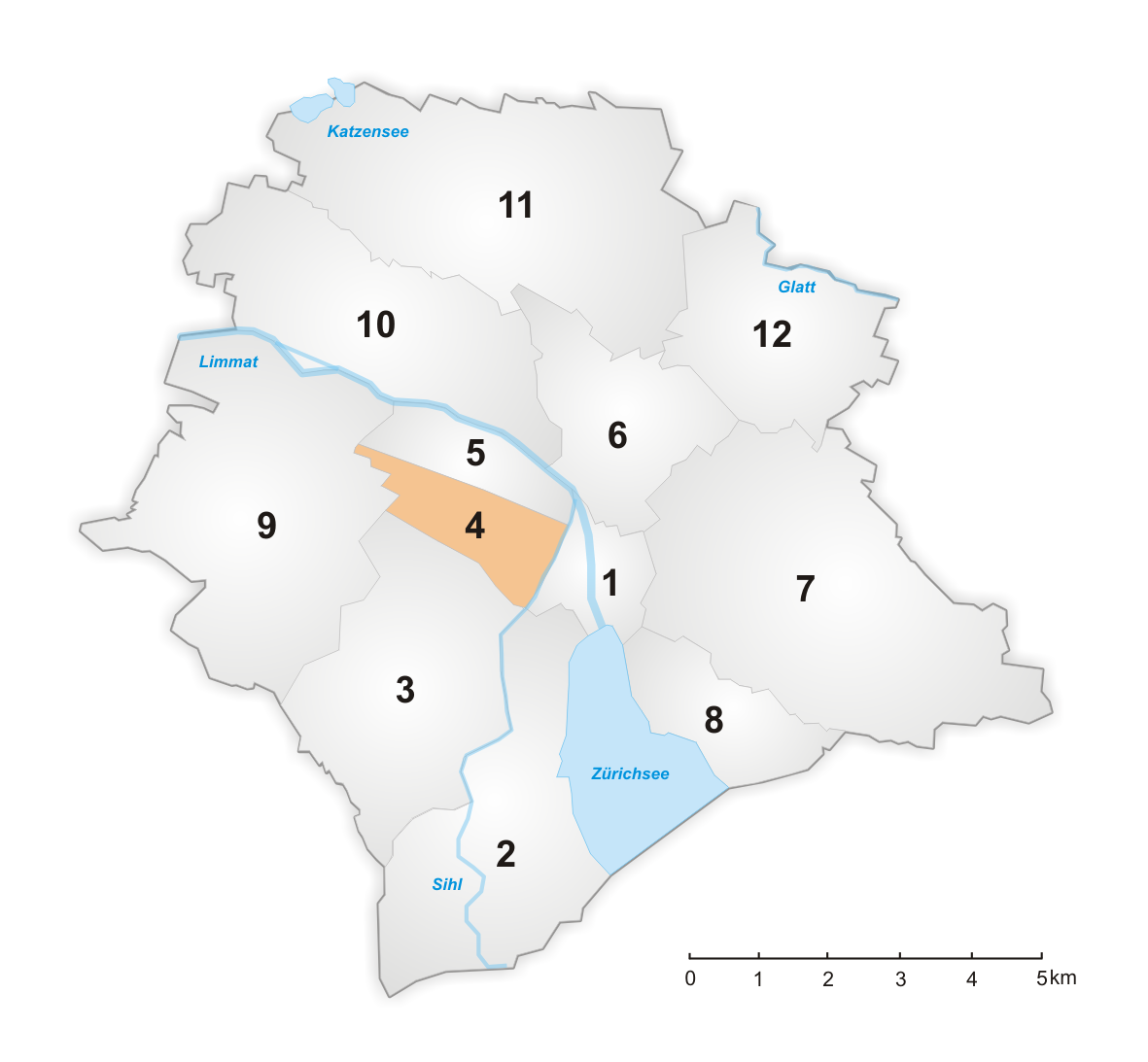
- Coordinates: 47.375°N 8.527°E
- Country: Switzerland
- Canton: Zürich
- City: Zürich

Area
  - Total: 2.9 km^{2} (1.1 sq mi)

Population (31. Dec. 2005)
  - Total: 26,961
  - Density: 9,297/km^{2} (24,080/sq mi)
- District Number: 4
- Quarters: Werd; Langstrasse; Hard

Corner Brauer-/Langstrasse

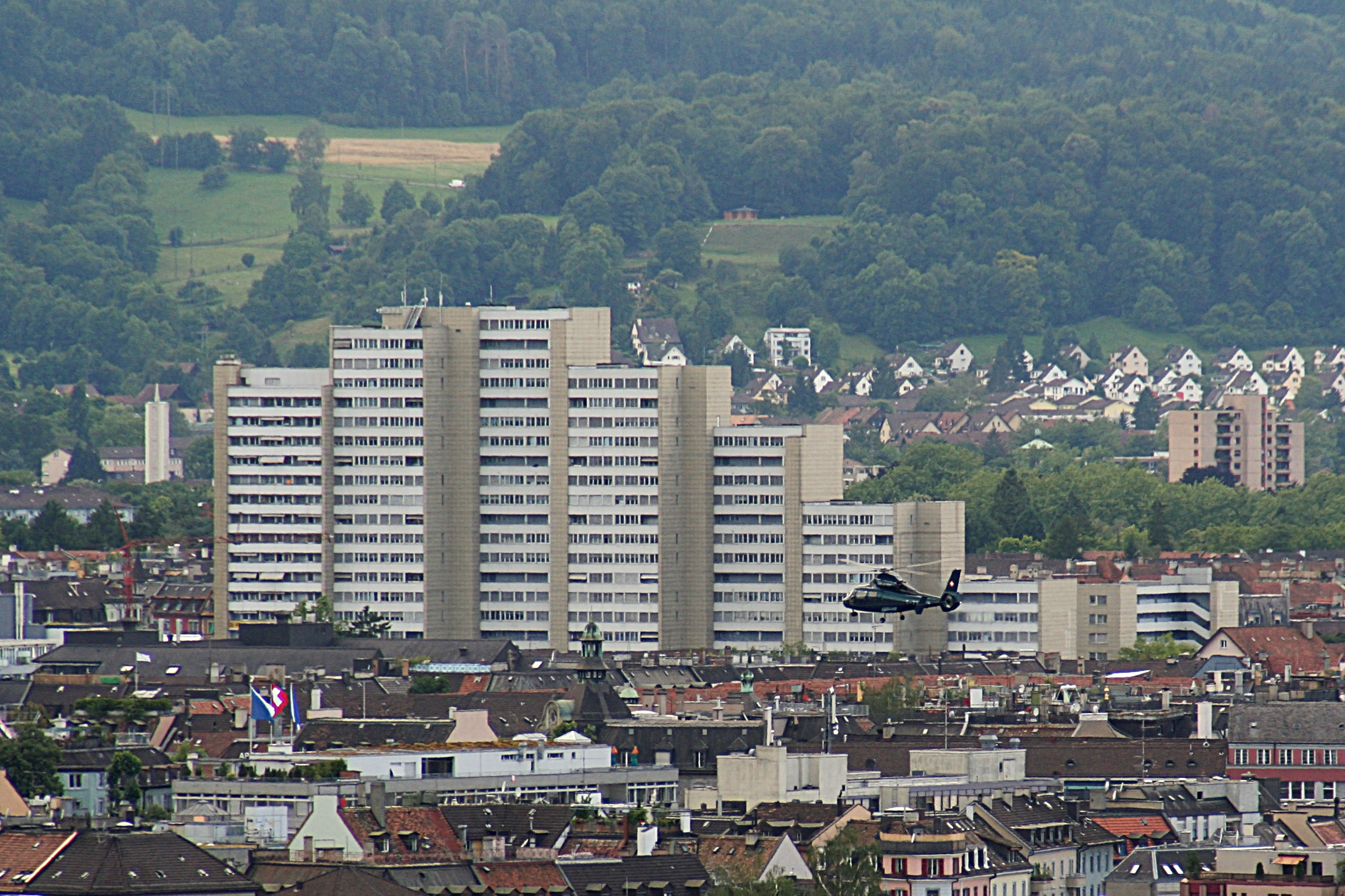
Lochergut apartment buildings

Aussersihl is a district in the Swiss city of Zürich. Known officially as District number 4, the district is known as colloquially Chreis Cheib, cheib being the Zürich German word for an animal cadaver. It earned the name as the area historically contained pits for the deposition of dead animals. It comprises the quarters Werd, Langstrasse and Hard.

== History ==
Aerial view (1953)

The area of Aussersihl together with that of District 5 historically corresponds to the Sihlfeld, the pastures and fields between the village of Wiedikon (now district 3) and the Limmat. The area was built up during the 18th century was separated from Wiedikon as the Aussersihl municipality on 27 March 1787. Aussersihl quickly grew into a town during industrialisation, mostly inhabited by factory workers, at times counting more inhabitants than the city itself. The municipality could not cope with its rapid growth and went bankrupt. It was incorporated into the Zürich municipality together with Wiedikon as Stadtkreis III in 1893. The separation into the current districts 3, 4 and 5 dates to 1913. Historically inhabited by migrant workers, the Aussersihl district, especially its Langstrasse quarter, remains notorious for a high crime rate, prostitution and drug dealing. The first project of pastor Ernst Sieber's Sozialwerke Pfarrer Sieber for homeless people started at Helvetiaplatz in winter 1963; the foundation is still based in Aussersihl.

=== Archaeological findings ===
A female who died in about 200 B.C found buried in a carved tree trunk during a construction project at the Kern school complex in March 2017 in Aussersihl. Archaeologists revealed that she was approximately 40 years old when she died and likely carried out little physical labor when she was alive. A sheepskin coat, a belt chain, a fancy wool dress, a scarf and a pendant made of glass and amber beads were also discovered with the woman.

== See also ==
- Stauffacher, Zürich
