= Volkshaus =

Coordinates: 47°22′32″N 8°31′38″E

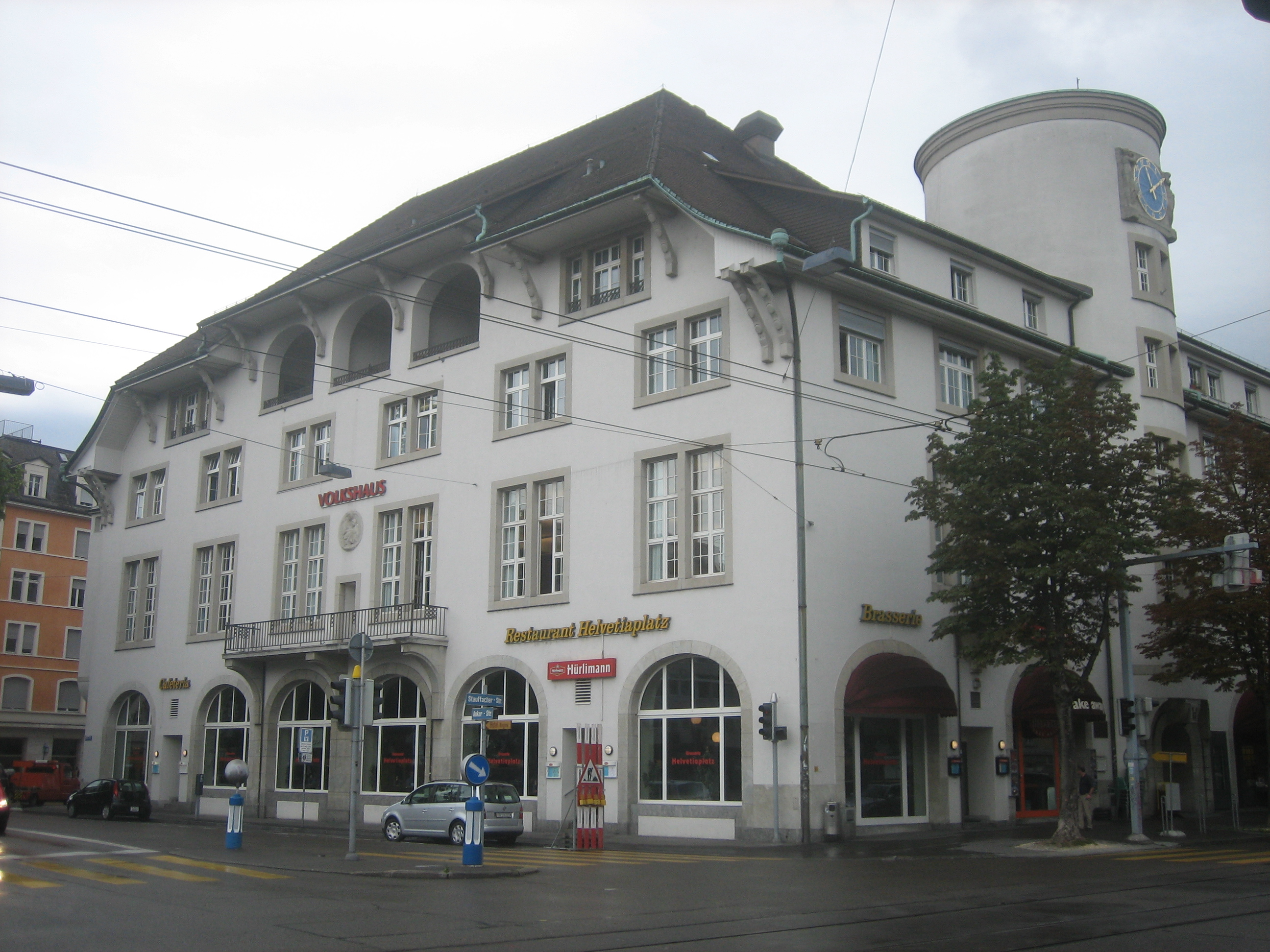
- Volkshaus in 2009
- Interactive map of Volkshaus
- Location: Stauffacherstrasse 60, 8004; Zürich, Switzerland
- Type: Music venue

Construction
- Opened: 1910

The Volkshaus is a 1,200-seat concert hall located on Helvetiaplatz in the city of Zurich, Switzerland. The building's construction began in June 1909 and it publicly opened the following year.
