= Werd =

Werd may refer to:

- WERD (Atlanta), the first radio station owned and programmed by African Americans.
- WZAZ, (1400 AM), Jacksonville, Florida radio station which held the WERD call sign from 1972 until 1984
- WCFO, (1160 AM), East Point, Georgia radio station which held the WERD call sign from 1995 until 1998
- Werd (Lake Constance), the main island of the small Lake Constance island group in Switzerland.
- Werd (Zürich), a district of the city of Zürich in Switzerland.
- Werdhölzli, an area of Zürich nearby Werdinsel.
- Werdinsel, a Limmat river island in Zürich.
- Werd, the German name for Vărd village, Chirpăr Commune, Sibiu County, Romania
- W~~E~~RD, a segment on The Late Show with Stephen Colbert
