= Sihlfeld =

Quarter of the city of Zurich, Switzerland

Coordinates: 47°22′21.27″N 8°31′03.33″E

- Quarter of Zurich
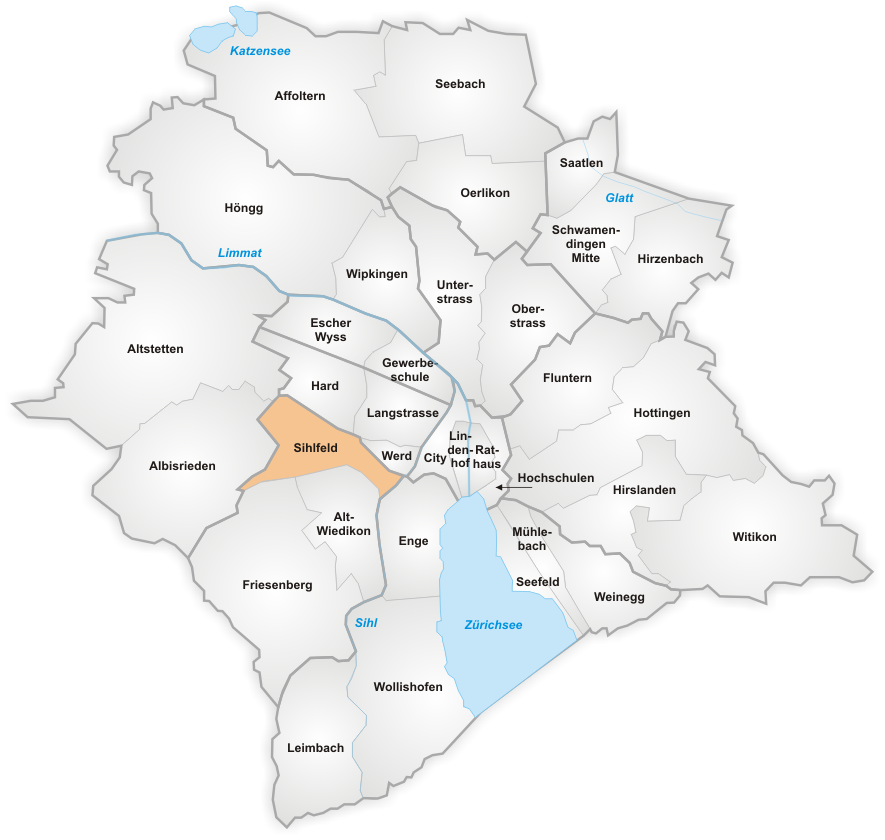
- The quarter of Sihlfeld in Zürich
- Country: Switzerland
- Canton: Zurich
- Municipality: Zurich
- District: Wiedikon

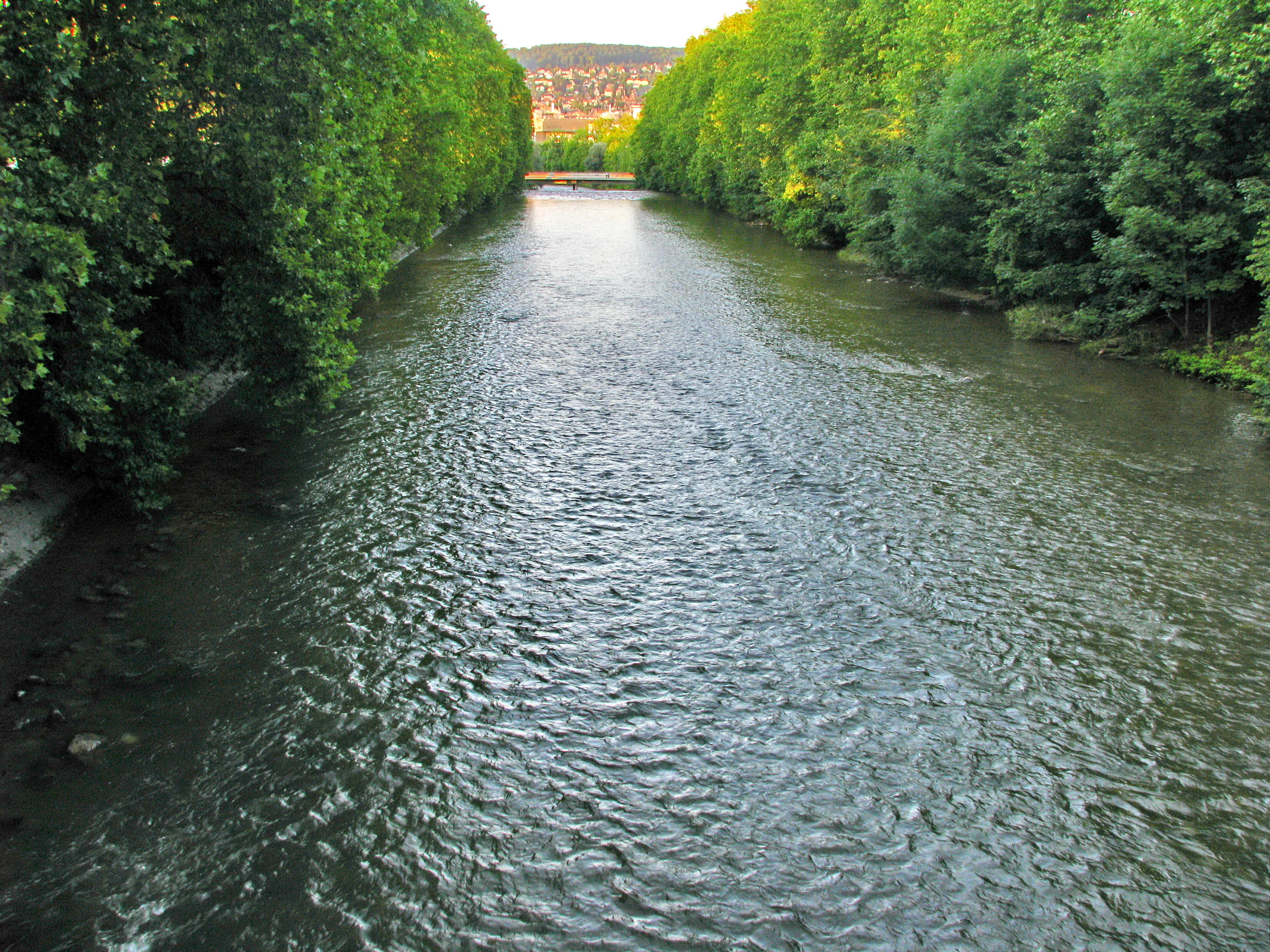
Sihl river in Sihlfeld quarter

Sihlfeld (Swiss Standard German pronunciation: [ˈziːlfɛld]) is a quarter in the district 3 of Zürich.

It was formerly a part of Wiedikon municipality, which was incorporated into Zürich in 1893.

As of 2025, the quarter has a population of 21,687 distributed on an area of 1.66 km^{2} (0.64 sq mi).
