= Sozialwerke Pfarrer Sieber =

Swiss charity and relief organization

- Named after: Ernst Sieber
- Formation: 1963
- Founder: Pastor Ernst Sieber
- Type: Non-profit organization and relief organisation
- Legal status: Foundation and relief organisation
- Purpose: to alleviate the hardships around addiction, disease, violence and homelessness
- Headquarters: Zürich-Aussersihl, Canton of Zürich
- Location: Hohlstrasse 192, CH-8004 Zürich
- Region served: Switzerland
- Method: capacity building
- Website: Official website (in German)

Sozialwerke Pfarrer Sieber (SWS) is a Swiss charitable foundation and relief organisation based the municipality of Zürich. Initiated in 1963 by Ernst Sieber, a pastor associated with the Reformierte Kirche des Kantons Zürich, the relief organisation was founded in 1988. SWS supports disadvantaged people, to help to alleviate the hardships around addiction, disease, violence and homelessness.

== History and orientation ==
In winter 1963, the first homeless community in a bunker in Zürich-Aussersihl was founded by Ernst Sieber, and in fact the charity started its first project that was follow by numerous initiatives over the decades, among them Sune-Dörfli, Sune-Egge, Ur-Dörfli, Sune-Stube, Pfuusbus, and Brothausen in Zürich-Affoltern for homeless people, or food supplement for poor people. In 1988 the foundation was formally established. The foundation claims to support, committed on the basis of the Gospel for needy fellow man...to help to alleviate the hardships around addiction, disease, violence and homelessness. Hence, to update the biblical message in view of social distress and the distress of individuals who are mentally and physically suffering, socially injured, homeless and refuged, drug addicted, and to inflict upon pastoral, social, medical and material assistance. SWS claims to cooperate with individuals, private, civil and ecclesiastical authorities, to ensure partnership and mutually complementary aid.

== Sieber-Huus ==
In Zürich-Affoltern, Sieber's foundation plans to combine some of the present Sieber institutions in a large complex in the so-called Sieber-Huus. The Reformed church of the canton of Zürich intends to be the building's owner. Sieber's foundation plans to contribute eleven million Swiss Francs to the interior design; the project amounts to 35 million Swiss Francs. From autumn 2021, the new building will house the Sune-Egge, the Sunegarte, the present settlement Brothuuse and the administration of the foundation. The Sune-Egge is a hospital for addicts, the Sunegarte is the corresponding nursing home. Brothuuse offers accommodation and care. As of 2017, the foundation comprises 13 facilities and services and employs 170 staff and around 100 volunteers.

== Pfuusbus ==
Pfuusbus, in fact a semitrailer truck, is one of the best known projects of the foundation. The bus for the homeless people in the greater Zürich area recorded 3,873 nights' stay, 700 more than last winter, between November 2015 and March 2016. The emergency shelter has been used by 278 people during the five winter months 2015/16. Over 150 nights, two caretakers have looked after the accommodation for the homeless people, assisted by two additional volunteers who have prepared more than 1,400 evening meals. In a separate tent, called Iglu (igloo), 206 homeless migrant workers were housed in Zürich-Seebach; they spent a total of 1,466 nights. Around two thirds of the migrant workers were from Romania who are employed mainly in Swiss agriculture in summer and autumn. The European migrant crisis, as the foundation communicated, did not affect the occupancy levels.
