= Hard (Zurich) =

Quarter in Zurich, Switzerland

- Quarter
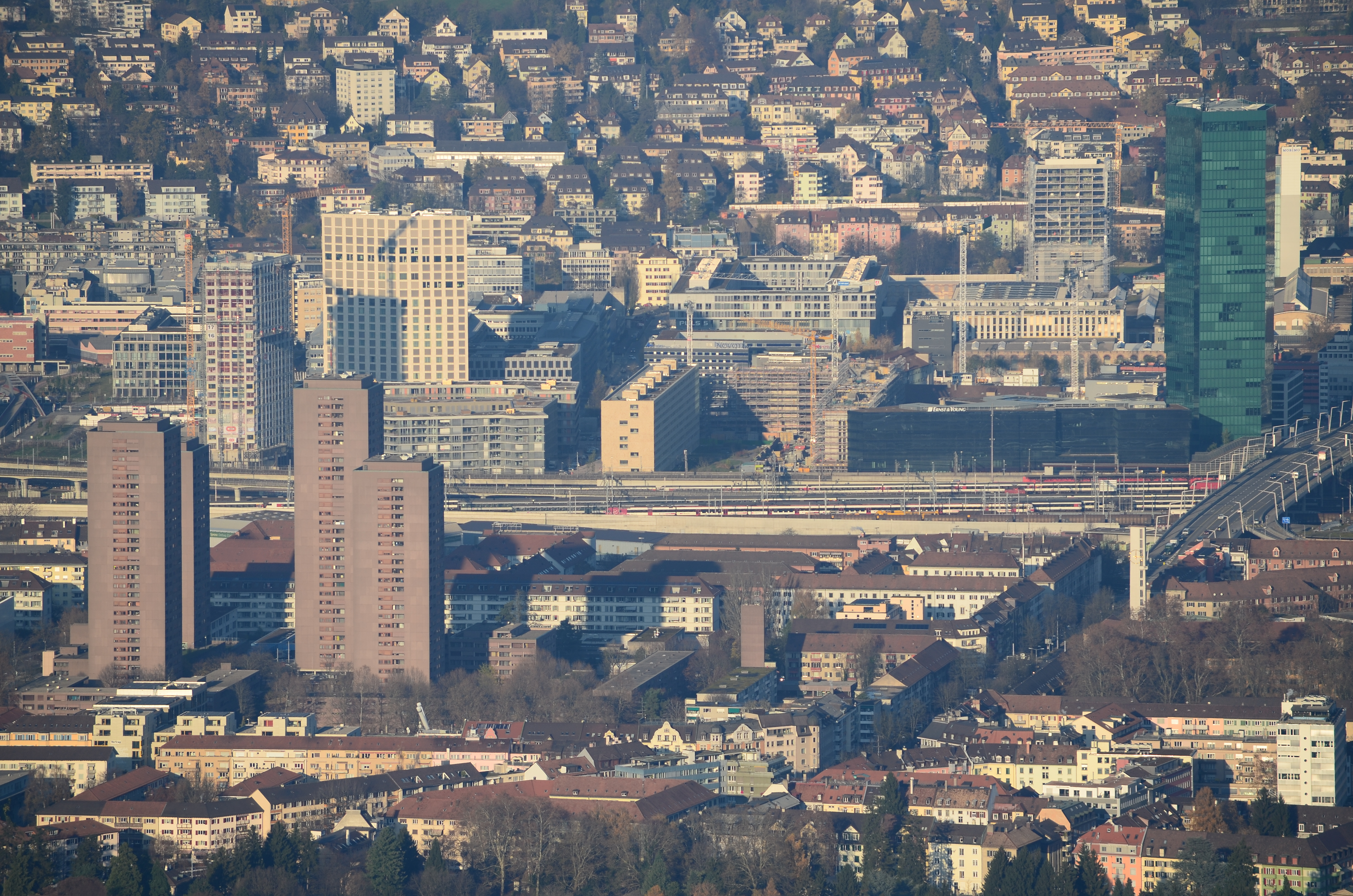
- Hard and Hardau buildings as seen from Uetliberg (November 2013)

- Flag Coat of arms

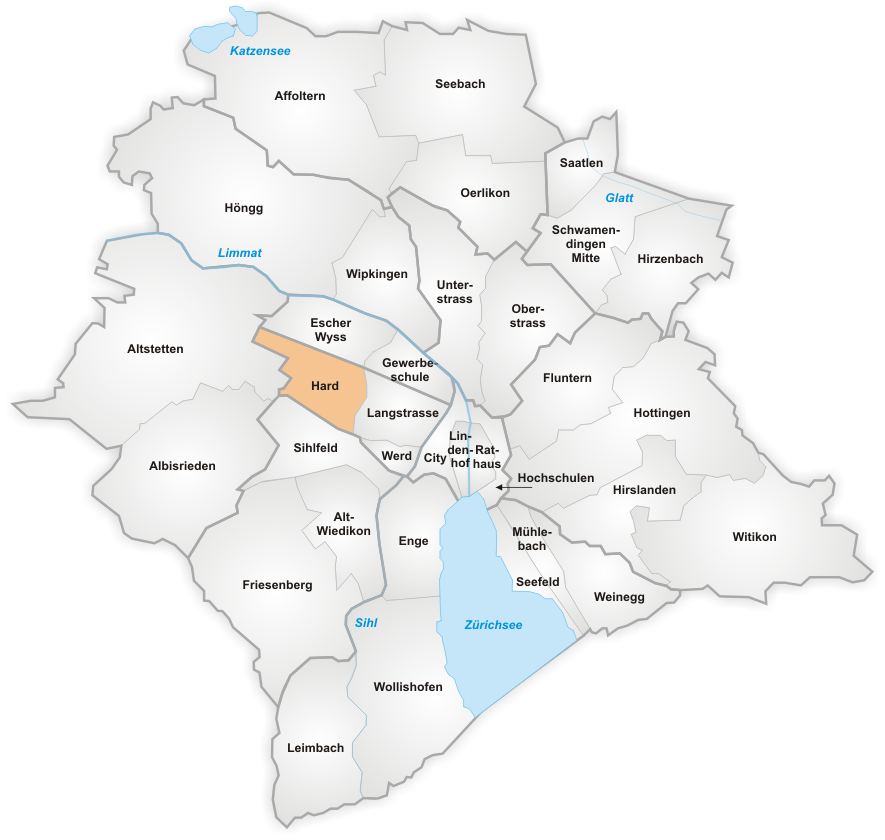
- The quarter of Hard in Zurich
- Coordinates: 47°22′57″N 8°30′38″E
- Country: Switzerland
- Canton: Zurich
- City: Zurich
- District: 4

Hard (Swiss Standard German pronunciation: [hard]) is a quarter in District 4 of Zurich. It was formerly a part of Aussersihl municipality, which was incorporated into Zurich in 1893. The quarter has a population of 12,715 distributed on an area of 1.46 km^{2} (as of 2009).

== Points of interest ==
Swissmill is the largest mill in Switzerland that operates 800 tons of grain. Although the silo's exterior and height is disputed, the municipal authorities claim that "the silo is intentionally designed in its aesthetically conscious way. Its external appearance is intended to express its interior – an industrial plant."
