= Ernst Sieber =

Swiss pastor (1927–2018)

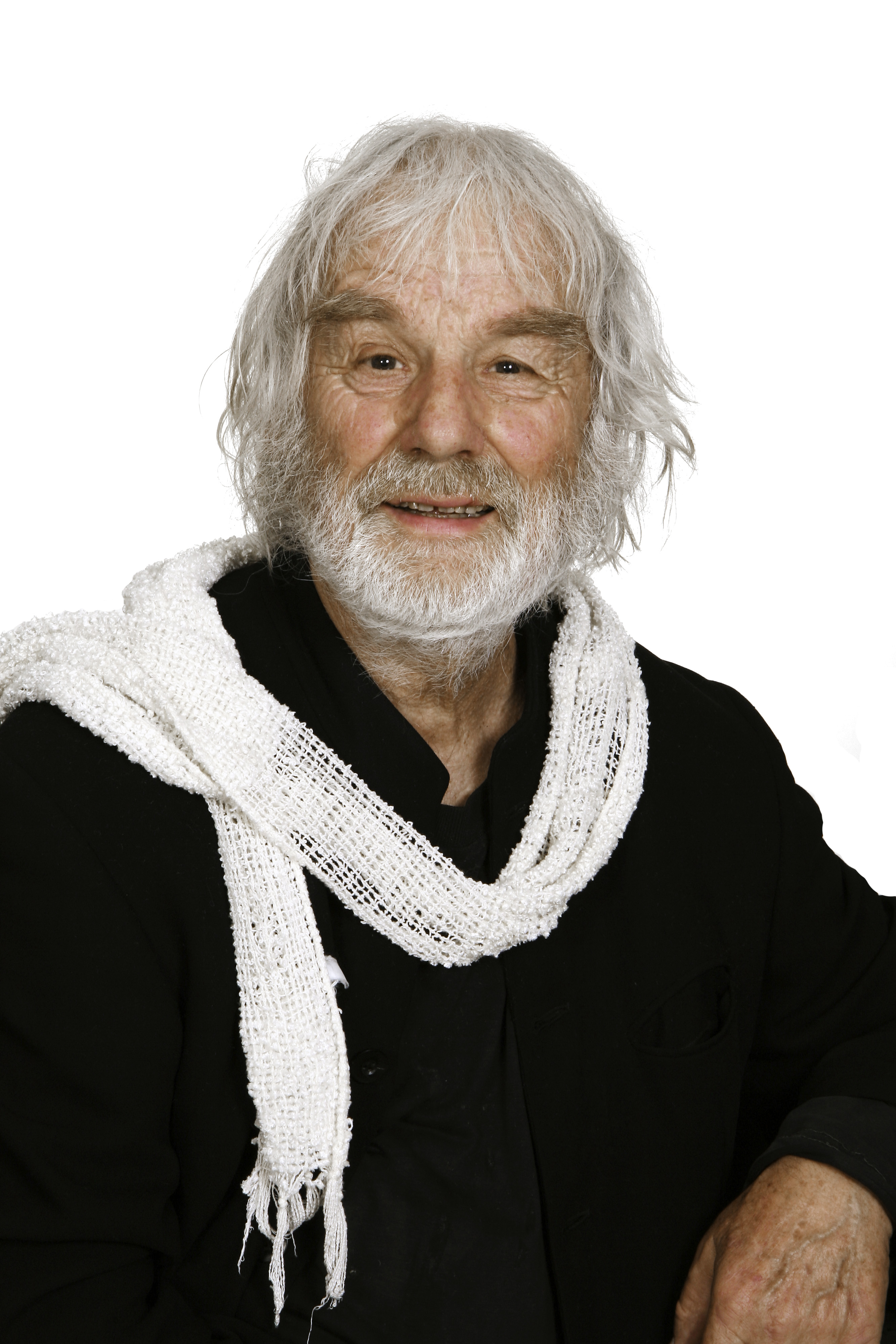
- Ernst Sieber in 2007

Member of National Council
- In office 25 November 1991 – 3 December 1995
- Constituency: Canton of Zürich

Personal details
- Born: Ernst Sieber; 24 February 1927 Horgen, Switzerland
- Died: 19 May 2018 (aged 91) Zürich, Switzerland
- Party: Evangelical People's Party
- Spouse: Sonja Vassalli (m. 1958)
- Children: 5
- Education: University of Zurich
- Occupation: Pastor, social activist and politician
- Website: Official website (in German)

Ernst Sieber (German pronunciation: [ɛʁnst ˈziːbɐ]; 24 February 1927 – 19 May 2018) was a Swiss pastor, social activist and politician who served one term as a member of the National Council (Switzerland) for the Evangelical People's Party. Sieber was one of the most popular and best known personalities associated with the Swiss Reformed Church. He was ordained in the Evangelical Reformed Church of the Canton of Zürich.

In 1963 he initiated the basis for the relief organisation Sozialwerke Pfarrer Sieber, founded in 1988 for "disadvantaged people, to help to alleviate the hardships around addiction, disease, violence and homelessness". This was primarily financed by his activities as an author.

== Early life and education ==
Sieber was born 24 February 1927 in Horgen, Switzerland, to Hans Sieber and Katharina Josepha (née Hess) Sieber. Sieber called himself a "dreamy child, I preferred to go fishing with my brother than to go to school", but also he said on occasion of an interview in February 2015: "The sense of justice and for the most vulnerable people in society has always been in me".

Sieber first worked as a farmhand in the French-speaking part of Switzerland, and graduated from the former Zürich agricultural school Strickhof in the present-day Irchelpark in 1947. In 1950 he gained the Maturität diploma on a second-chance education. He decided to study theology and was ordinated at the Theological Faculty of the University of Zürich in 1956.

== Career ==
As a vicar, community and prison chaplain, and priest Sieber engaged for the "people on the margins of our society". After his tenure between 1956 and 1967 in Uitikon-Waldegg, in 1967 he became the parish priest in Zürich-Altstetten where he worked until his retirement as pastor in 1992.

In Winter 1963 Sieber initiated a shelter for homeless and marginalized people in Zürich-Aussersihl, and began to establish further projects, among others for drug addicts at Platzspitz park and Letten in the 1980s. At the time of the so-called "open drug scene" in Zürich, Sieber provided the addicts with soup and bread, and gave them shelter. In 1971 he founded the Zürich working group for youth problems and thus set an early institutional example against the drug problem. With his commitment he initiated the 1990s discussions about "new, better and more humane drug policies" in Switzerland. "His understanding of the people without shelter, for drug or alcohol addicts was and is leading the way".

Supported by his wife Sonja Sieber Vassalli and many other helpers, Sieber established a wide range of projects in the city of Zürich and in its agglomeration. From 1988 to 1992 he was appointed as dean of the city of Zürich links der Limmat, meaning the area on the left bank of the Limmat. Between 1991 and 1995 the popular pastor was elected (for the EVP political party) by the citizens of the canton of Zürich as their representative in the Nationalrat, the Swiss parliament's lower house. For his life's work Sieber was awarded by Zürich's mayor Corine Mauch on behalf of the city council with Staatssiegel von Zürich, the seal of the former city republic of Zürich, on 18 September 2013.

=== Sozialwerke Pfarrer Sieber ===
In 1963, Sieber established the first homeless community in a bunker in Zürich-Aussersihl. The later charity Sozialwerke Pfarrer Sieber (SWS) started numerous initiatives over the decades, among them Sune-Dörfli, Sune-Egge, Ur-Dörfli, Sune-Stube, Pfuusbus, and the Brothausen settlement in Zürich-Affoltern for homeless people, or food supplement for poor people in cooperation with Swiss retailers. In 1988 the foundation was formally established, to support, "committed on the basis of the Gospel...to help to alleviate the hardships around addiction, disease, violence and homelessness." The foundation calls its work an "update of the biblical message in view of social distress and the distress of individuals who are mentally and physically suffering, socially injured, homeless and refuged, drug addicted". To give pastoral, social, medical and material assistance, as well as to ensure partnership and mutually complementary aid, SWS states that it cooperates with individuals, private, civil and ecclesiastical authorities.

== Death ==
Sieber died on 19 May 2018 at the age of 91 in Triemli Hospital in Zürich.

== Awards (excerpt) ==
- 2017: Prix-Courage-Lifetime-Award
- 2013: Staatssiegel von Zürich
- 1987: Honorary Doctorate of the Theological Faculty of the University of Zürich

== Publications ==
- Licht im Tunnel: Unterwegs von Assisi nach Zürich. Zytglogge, Gümligen 1998, ISBN 3-72960-541-0.
- Platzspitz, Spitze des Eisbergs: Jugend- und Erwachsenenprobleme unserer Zeit: Begegnungen, Begebenheiten und eine Vision für die Zukunft. Zytglogge, Gümligen 1991, ISBN 3-72960-373-6.
- Menschenware – wahre Menschen: Vom Bunker zum Suneboge. Die Familiengeschichte der Obdachlosen. Zytglogge, Gümligen 1987, ISBN 3-72960-249-7.

== Literature ==
- Daniel J. Schütz: Der Pfarrer: Begegnungen mit Ernst Sieber. Zytglogge, Oberhofen 2008, ISBN 978-3-7296-0753-8.
