= Wiedikon =

Wiedikon District of the city of Zurich
- District
- Flag Seal

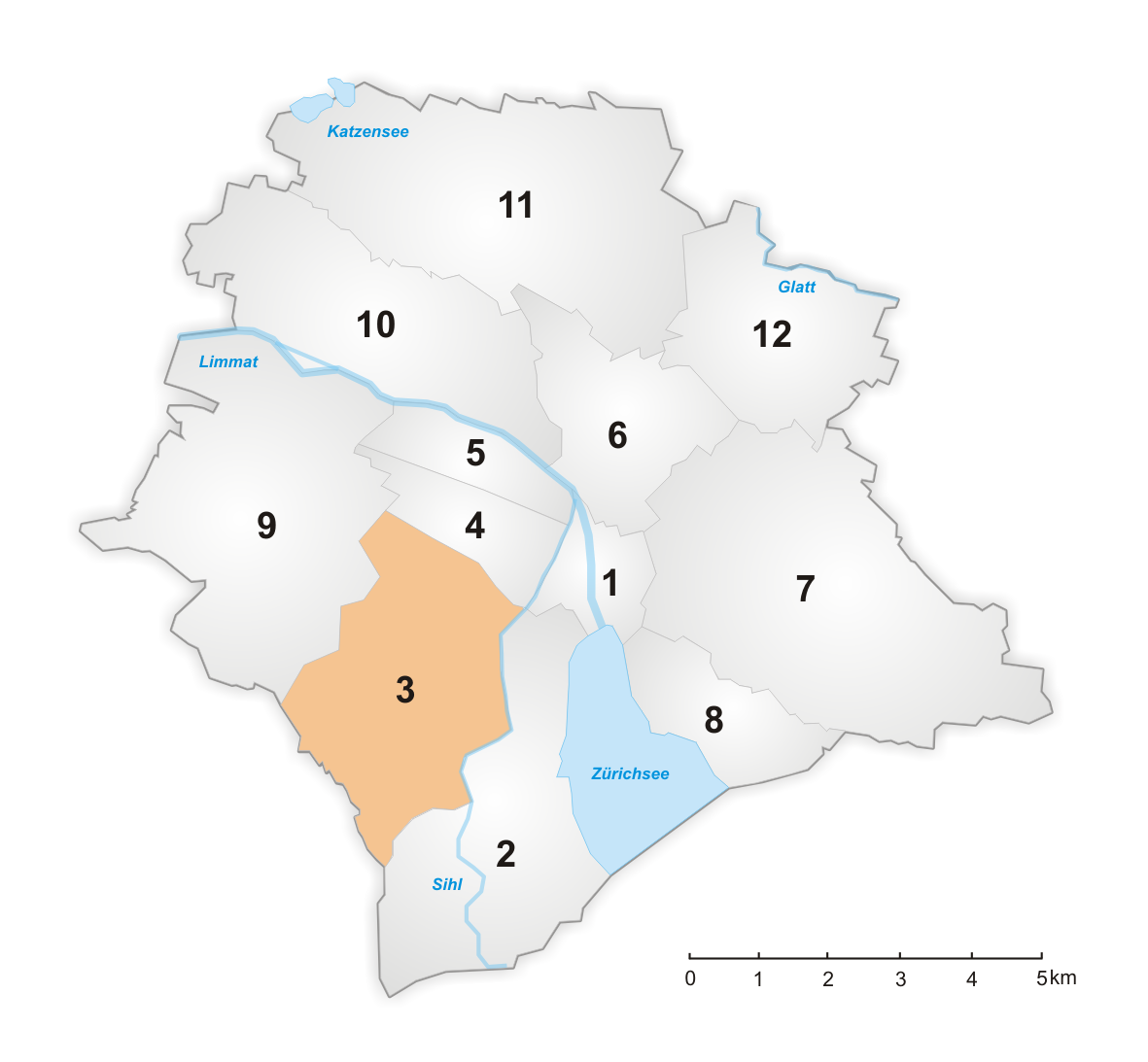
- Coordinates: 47°22′N 8°31′E
- Country: Switzerland
- Canton: Zurich
- City: Zurich

Area
  - Total: 8.65 km^{2} (3.34 sq mi)

Population (31. Dec. 2005)
  - Total: 45,885
  - Density: 5,305/km^{2} (13,740/sq mi)
- District Number: 3
- Quarters: Alt-Wiedikon; Sihlfeld; Friesenberg

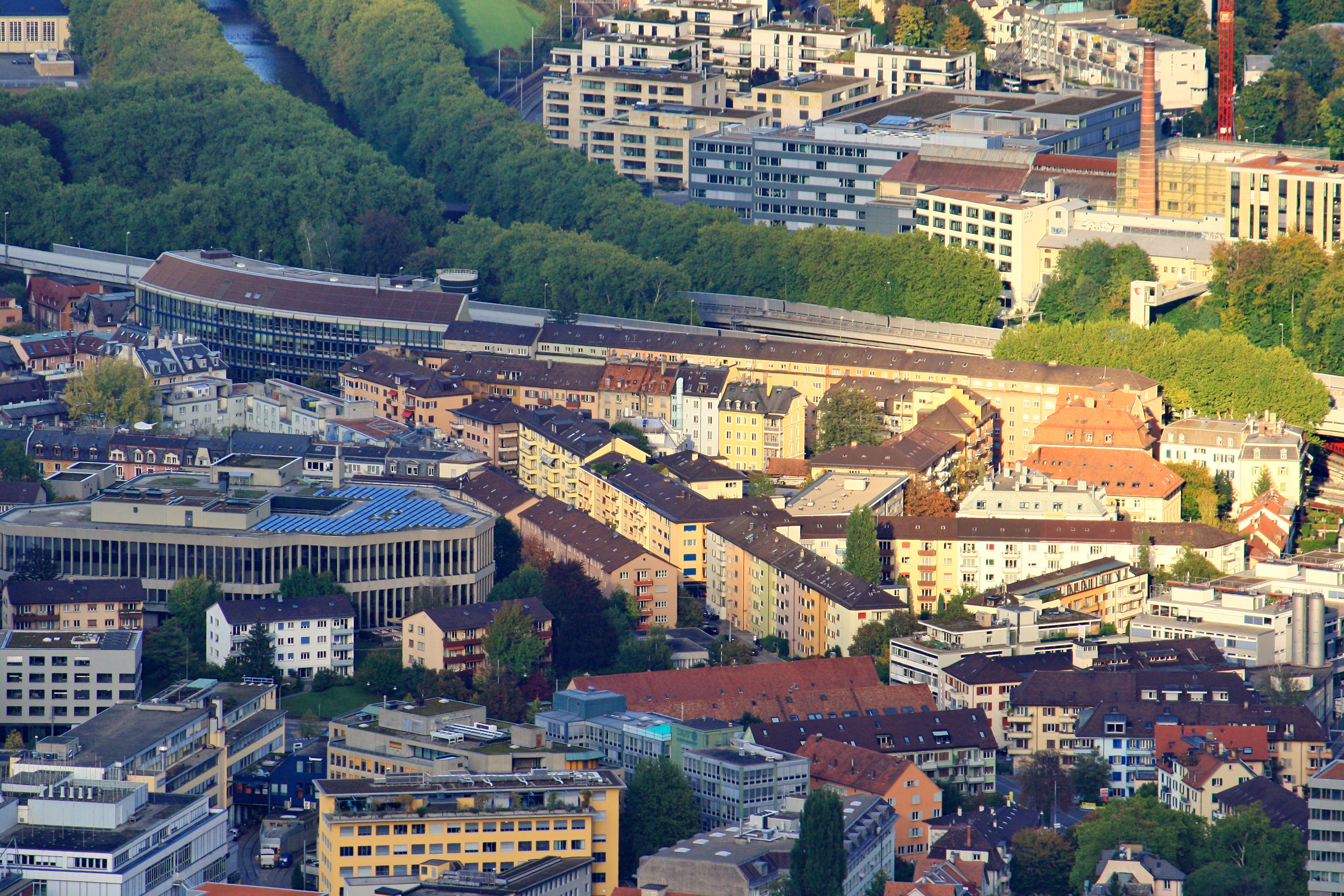
Wiedikon as seen from Uetliberg (October 2009)

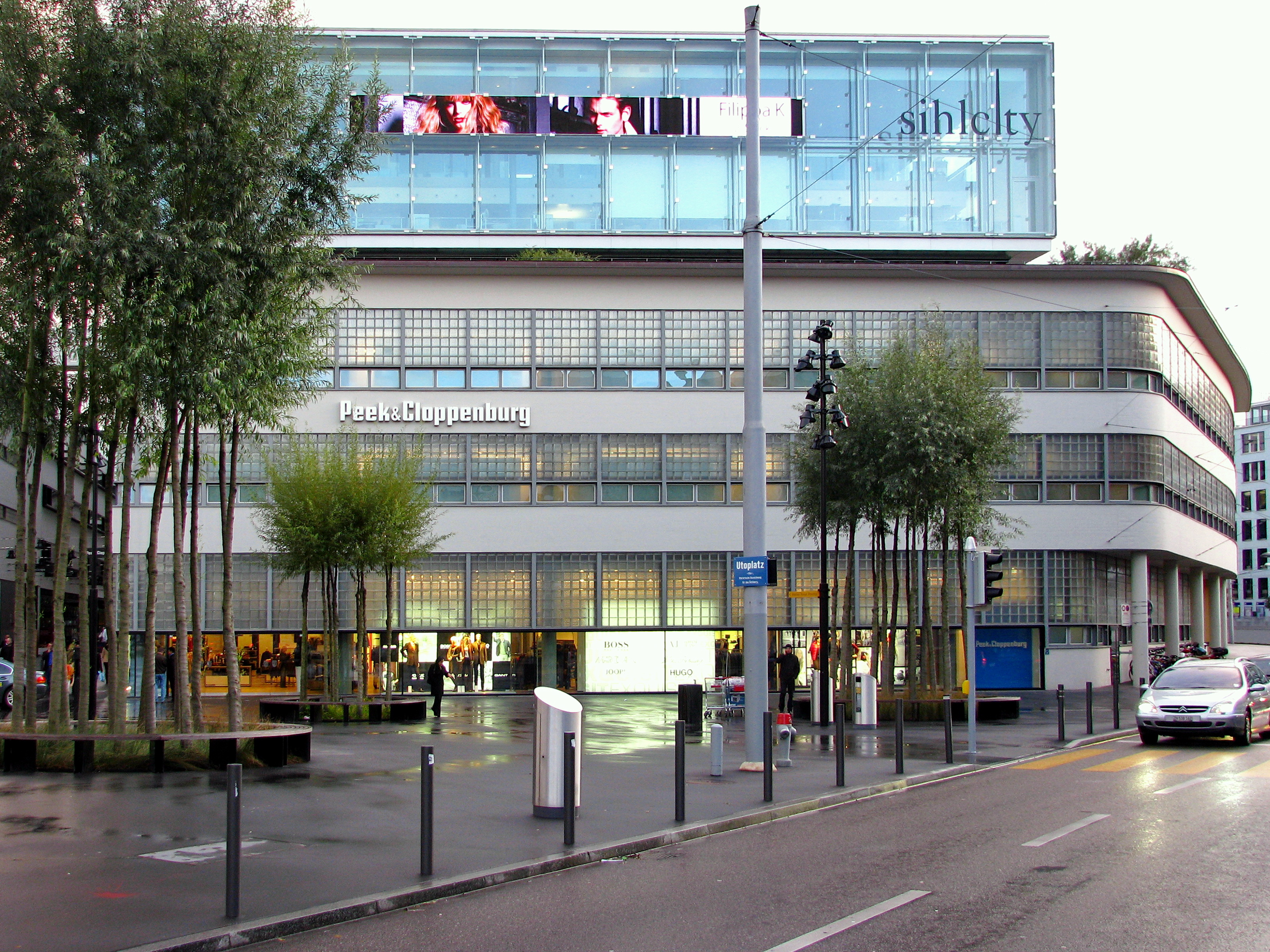
Sihlcity shopping mall

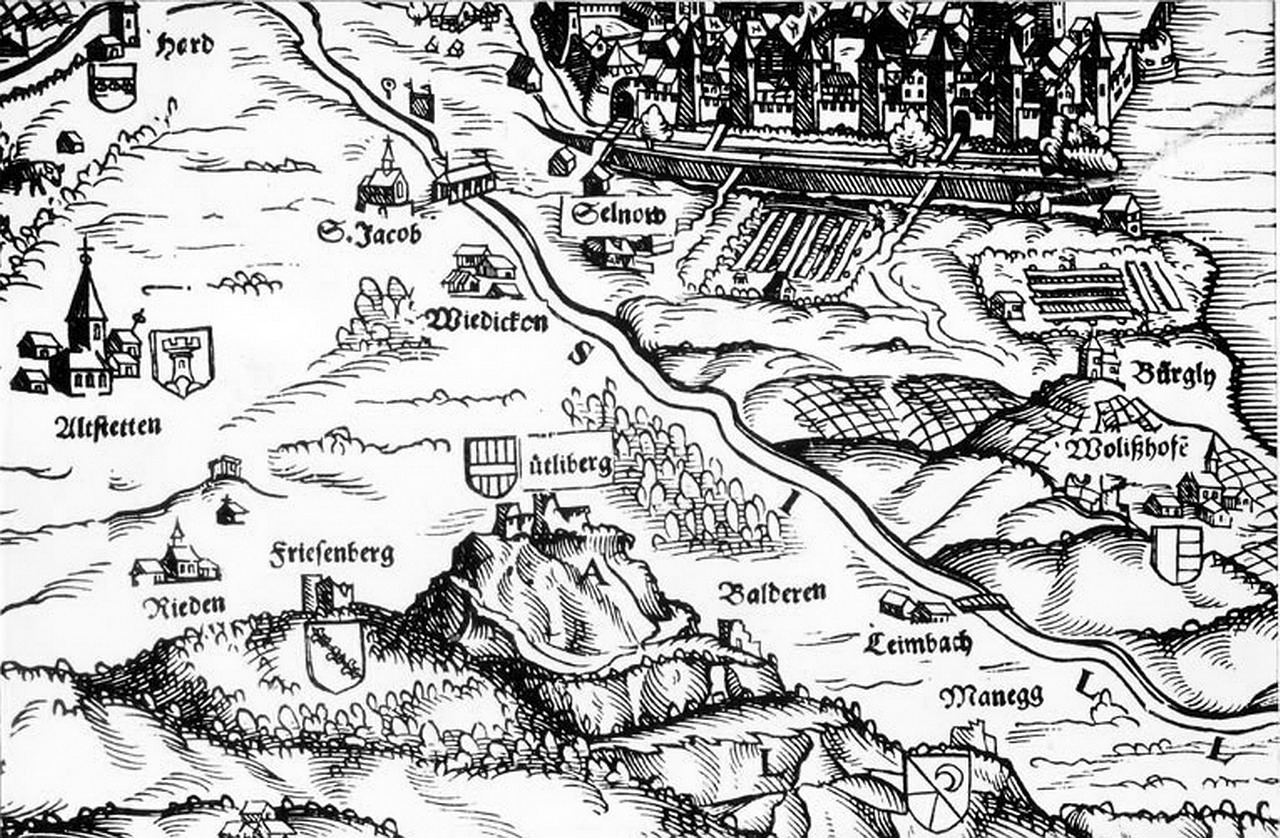
Wiedikon (centered) on Murerplan (1566)

Wiedikon is a district in the Swiss city of Zurich. It corresponds to District number 3 and comprises the neighborhoods of Alt-Wiedikon, Sihlfeld and Friesenberg.

Wiedikon was formerly a municipality of its own, having been incorporated into Zurich in 1893.

Aerial view (1968)

== Transport ==
The district is a major hub for the Zürich S-Bahn network. Zürich Wiedikon railway station is a notable architectural landmark, being one of the few Reiterbahnhof (bridge stations) in Switzerland, with the station building situated directly over the tracks. It is served by lines S2, S8, and S24.

Wiedikon is also served by the Sihltal Zürich Uetliberg Bahn (SZU), which provides access to the Uetliberg mountain (S10) and the Sihl Valley (S4). Several Zürich tram lines (9, 13, and 14) and trolleybus lines connect the district to the city center and neighboring districts.
