= Langstrasse =

Quarter of the city of Zurich, Switzerland

Coordinates: 47°22′34.57″N 8°31′36.02″E

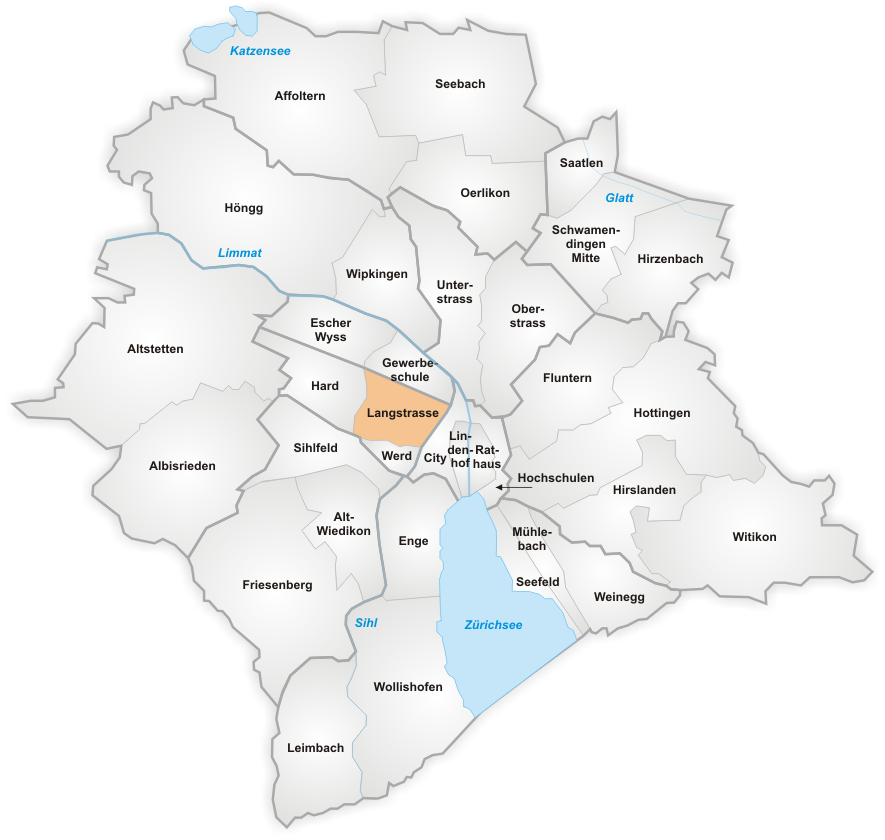
The quarter of Langstrasse in Zurich

Langstrasse (lit. 'long street') is a street and quarter in district 4 in Zurich. Langstrasse begins near the district courts and extends north-northeast to the train tracks of Zürich Hauptbahnhof. The following short segment of Langstrasse leads towards Limmatplatz in Industriequartier (district 5). Langstrasse is also referred to as a general area including the street and its surrounding tertiary streets.

The quarter has a population of 10,500 on an area of 1.13 km². It is notorious as Zurich's red light district, with an above-average crime rate, drug dealing and brothels. It is also the most overtly multicultural spot in Zurich, with a rate of 42% foreign residents, among the highest in Zurich. Due to the problems in this district, the City Council approved the comprehensive project "Langstrasse PLUS" on 14 March 2001 to achieve an improvement in public order and safety.

As the historical quarter of factory workers during Industrialisation, Aussersihl is also the traditional center of socialist and communist agitation in Zurich, the Helvetiaplatz on Langstrasse being a traditional site of May Day manifestations.

Langstrasse is currently undergoing a process of gentrification in certain areas, spurring public debate both in the quarter and city-at-large regarding its social, spatial, and economic future.

== Festivals ==
Langstrasse and the same named Longstreet Bar

Langstrasse, view toward Limmatplatz

Langstrassenfest
The Langstrassenfest (eng. Longstreet Festival) is an important part of the Langstrasse PLUS campaign. It has been taking place every two years since 1996, and counted about 270'000 visitors in 2004. In the years without a Langstrassenfest, the Longstreet Carneval takes place. The Langstrassenfest is organised by Swiss citizens.
Longstreet Carneval
If there is no Langstrassenfest, the Longstreet Carneval takes place. This Carneval is organised by non Swiss citizens.
Caliente
The Caliente Festival is the biggest Latin Festival in all of Europe. It counts over 130'000 visitors in the year 2006.
Open-Air-Cinema
Every summer during July/August an open-air cinema is installed at the Kanzleiareal near the Helvetiaplatz.

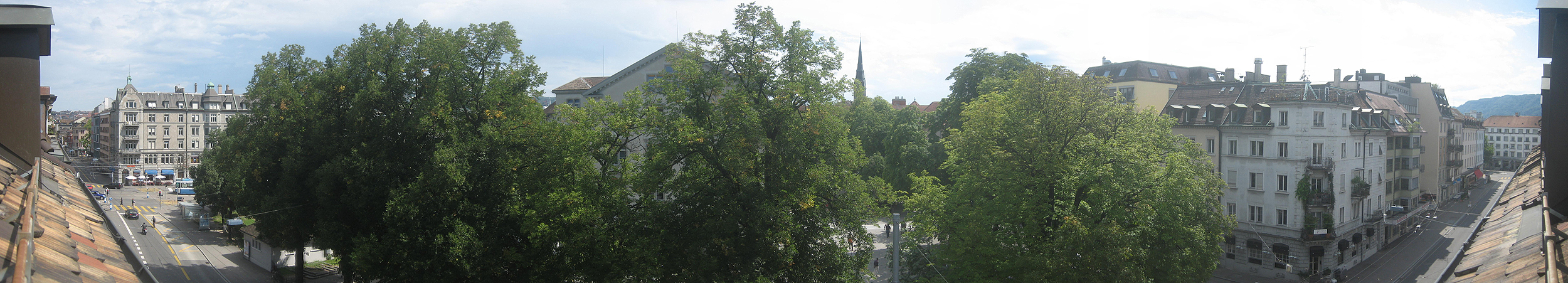
Panorama of the Langstrasse between Badener- and Stauffacherstrasse
