= Werdinsel =

Limmat river island in Zürich, Switzerland

Native name: Werdinsel Nickname: Werd; Flussbad Au-Höngg; Limmatauen; Werdhölzli
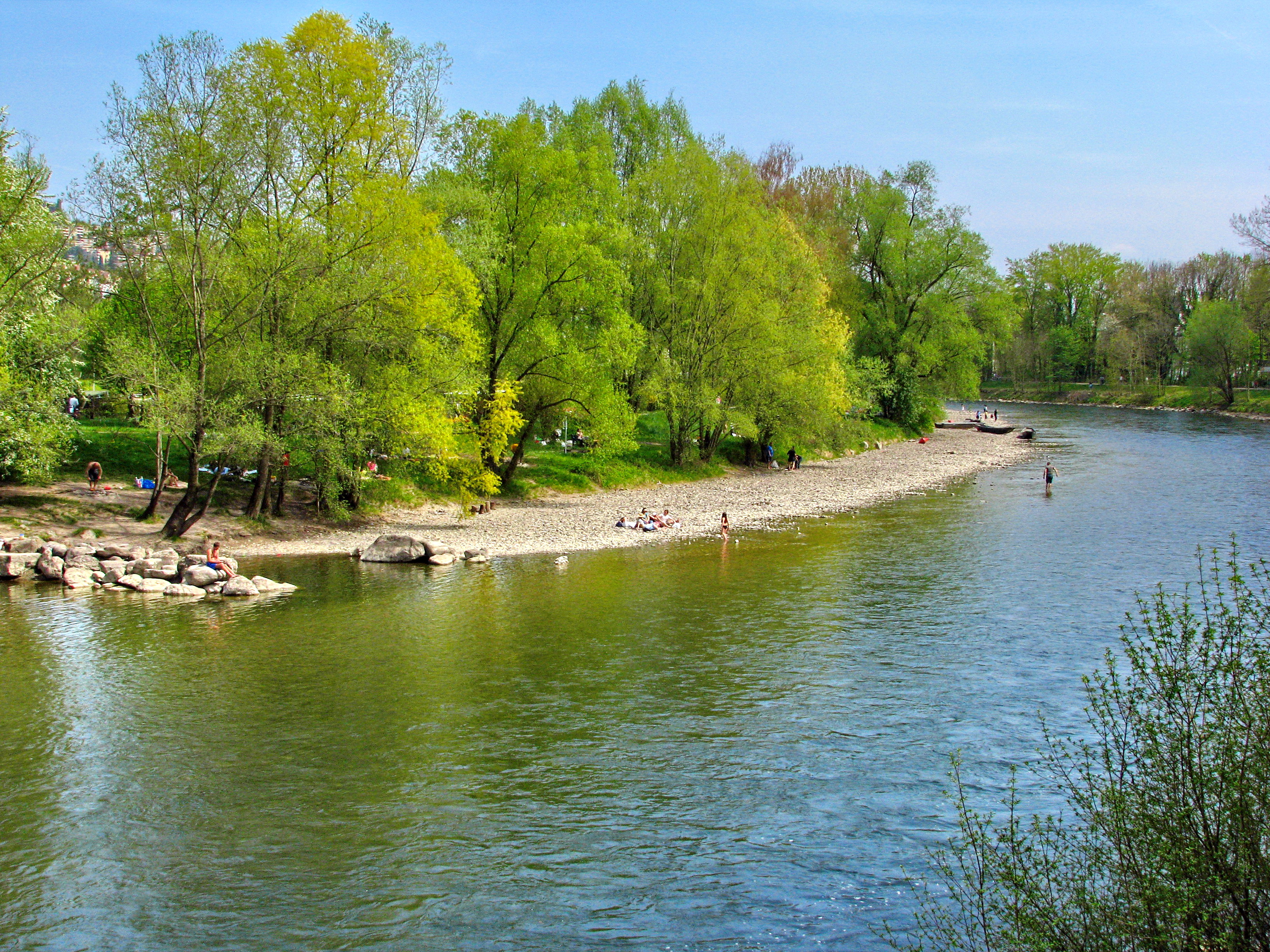
- Werdinsel in the Limmat in Zürich

- Location within Switzerland

Geography
- Location: Limmat
- Coordinates: 47.4000°N 8.4875°E
- Total islands: 1
- Area: 0.06 km^{2} (0.023 sq mi)
- Highest elevation: 403 m (1322 ft)

Administration
- Switzerland
- Canton: Zürich
- District: Höngg

Demographics
- Population: 0 (December 2014)

Werdinsel, also known as Limmatauen Werdhölzli, is an island and a protected area in the Limmat river in Switzerland.

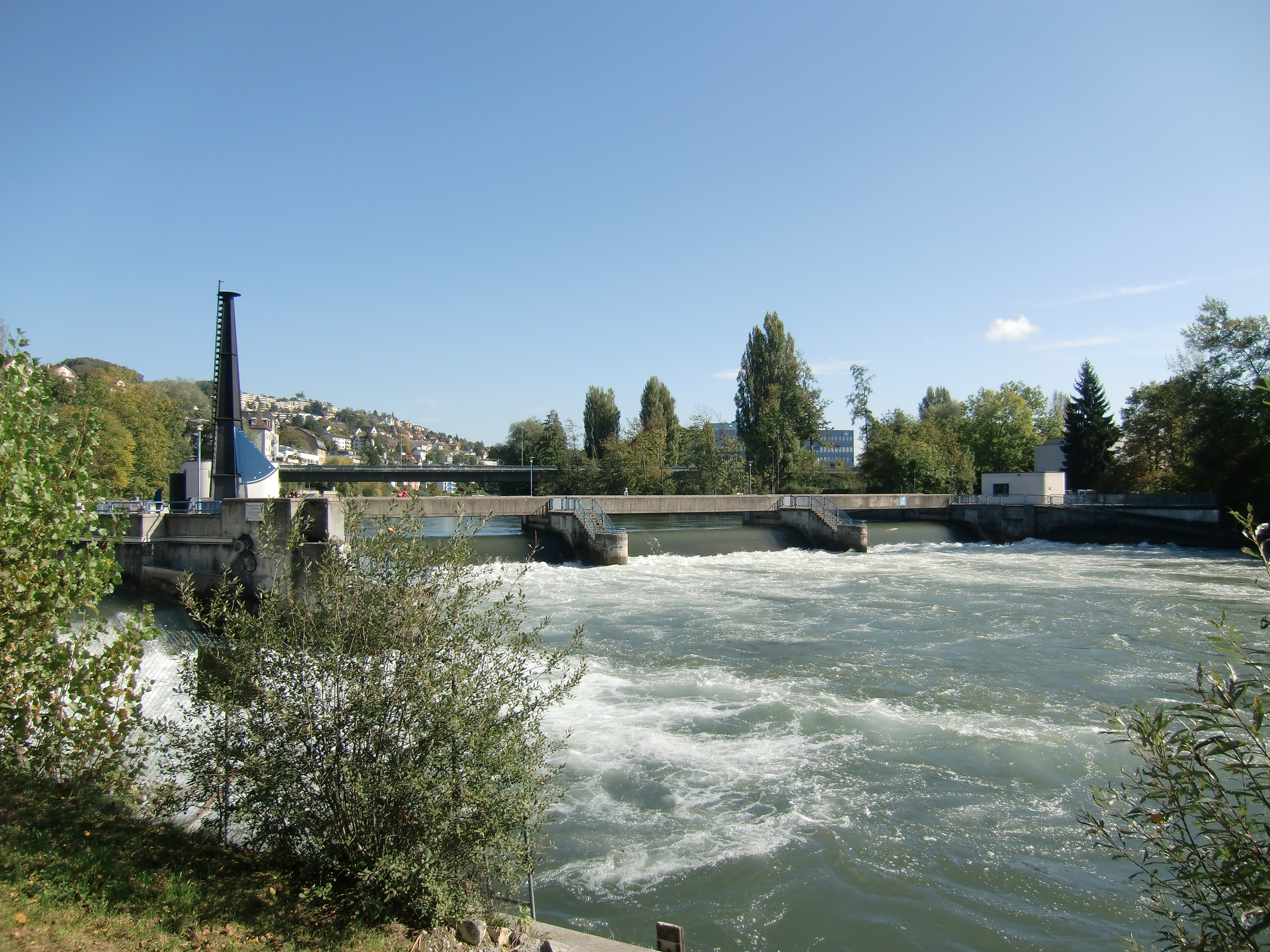
Weir at the power plant

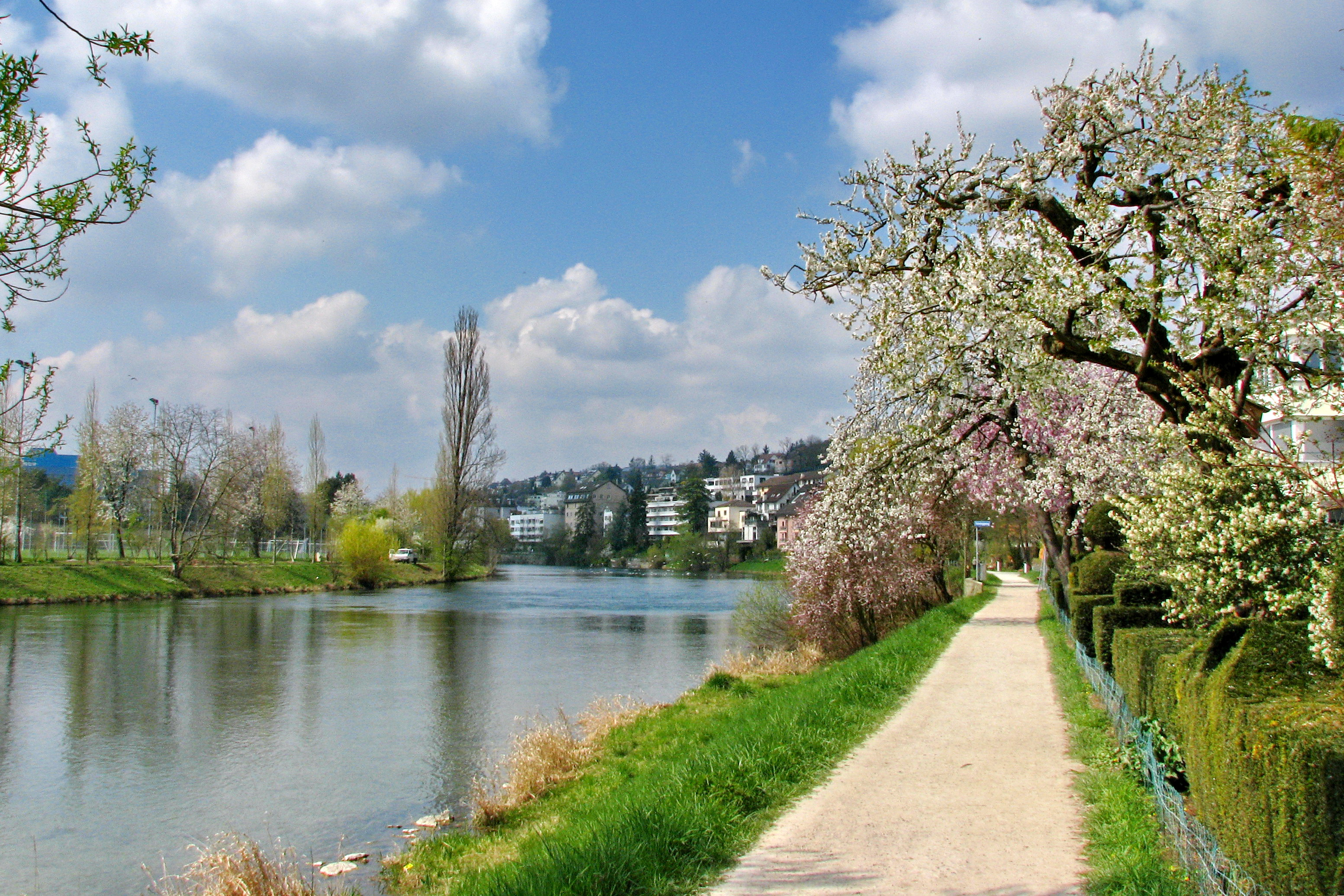
Pathway towards Fahr Abbey

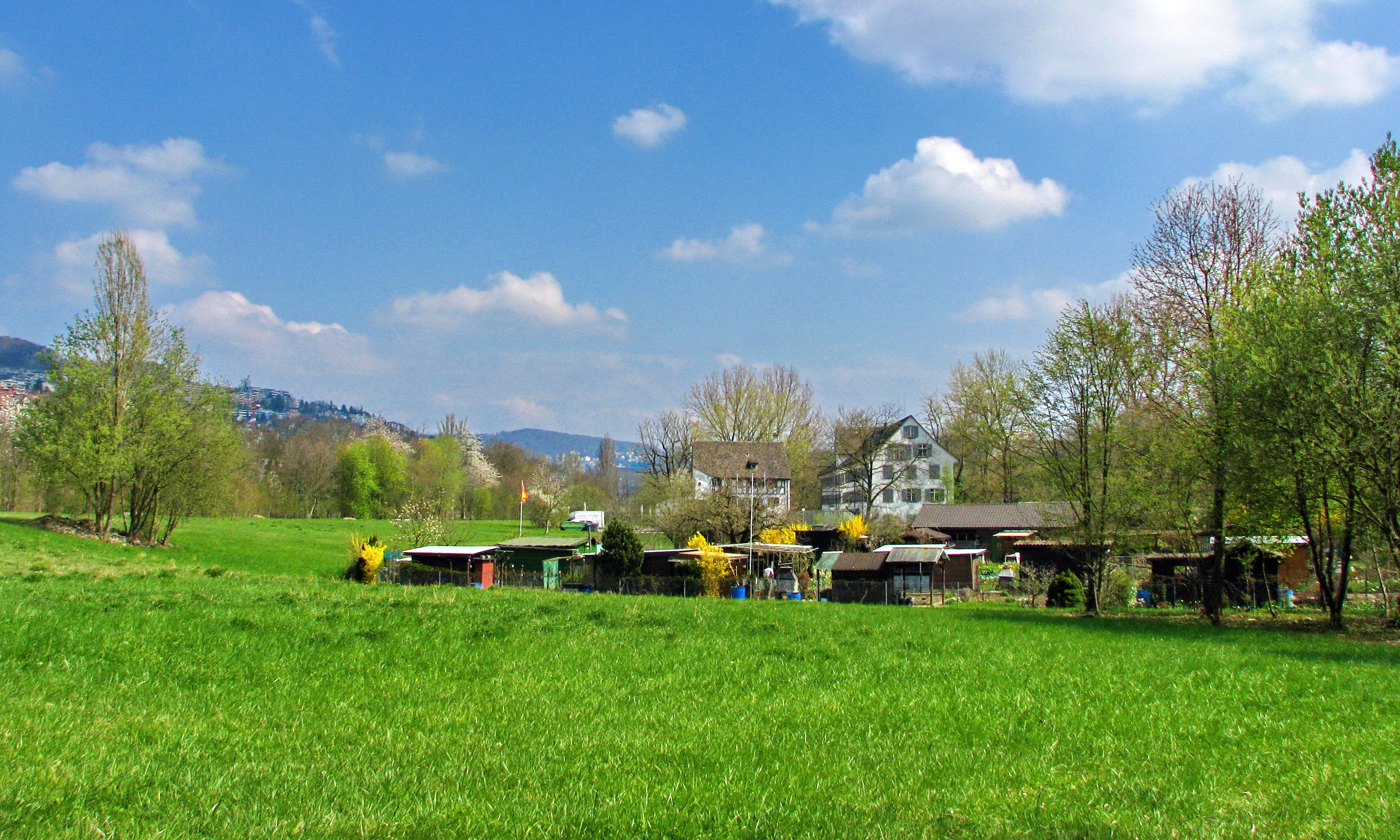
The river island's area towards Limmatauen

== Geography ==
Located in the municipality of Höngg, the river island is a popular recreation area, public park and bathing area in the Limmat, situated in the northern suburban area of the Limmat Valley in Zürich. The island has a maximum length of about 550 metres (1,804 ft) and a maximum width of about 125 metres (410 ft). Its highest point is about 403 metres (1,322 ft) above sea level, a few metres above the river level at Zürich-Höngg. The minimum distance from the river bank is about 10 metres (33 ft), and the island is also separated by the artificial Giessen channel.

== Recreation ==
The so-called Flussbad Au-Höngg is one of four public river baths situated in the Limmat within the city of Zürich. The entrance is free but infrastructure for bathers is limited. The Zürich tram line 17 (stop Tüffenwies) and the local Verkehrsbetriebe Zürich VBZ bus lines 80 and 89 (stop Winzerhalde) provide public transportation. The island also houses a restaurant, grill stations, family gardens, sand beaches and a forested area, the adjoining Limmat-Auen Werdhölzli protected area.

For decades, the river island has been called a 'conflict zone' related to its public use; it is used by diverse and sometimes conflicting groups of people (i.e. nudists and non-nudists) in the area. Another issue is the high volume of visitors; on peak days, up to 4,500 people come seeking recreation, totalling nearly half a million annually. This influx includes visitors from neighboring cantons, which leads to increased road traffic. The city police (legally) allow anyone to roam naked in public, and "even outdoor sex is not illegal as long as no one raises indictment". The city police force regularly patrols the ground, and the municipal authorities started to install "beware of the naked" signs in August 2015.

== Limmatauen ==
Limmatauen Werdhölzli is a protected forest and river area, partially situated in the municipality of Oberengstringen, and there is a more than 130 year old flood protection plan between two neighboring municipalities. Set under protection in 1945, the 1.8 kilometres (1.1 mi) long section of the Limmat was renatured, which enhanced the biodiversity, and thus the quality of the river landscape. In cooperation with the Canton of Zurich, the municipalities of Oberengstringen and Zürich, renewed that section of the river in September 2013. In addition to improved access to the Limmat and the hiking path towards the Fahr Abbey, the area was widened for pedestrians and cyclists. Orientation boards share information about the endemic flora and fauna. The area's riparian zone may be crossed via a 320 metres (1,050 ft) long wooden bridge, built using material from urban forests, allowing visitors to discover with open eyes and senses what lives and grows here. Along the ridge, there are bat boxes in the trees. After nearly a year of construction, the project was officially presented to the public on 20 September 2013. The costs of 9.4 million Swiss Francs were provided by the city and cantonal government, and some companies in collaboration with World Wildlife Fund Switzerland.

== Cultural heritage ==
A watermill of the Wettingen Abbey was first mentioned in 1365. The island is a historical site of water industrialization in Zürich, and also houses the former spinning mill "Strickler", as well as the "Kraftwerk Werd", one of the oldest power plants in Zürich. "Werd" is an old term used in the German language for a "river island." The sites are listed in the Swiss inventory of cultural property of national and regional significance.

== Trivia ==
In Switzerland, both burials and cremations are permitted by the law, so the island (or, rather, the river) is also used for flow burials.

== See also ==
- List of islands of Switzerland
