= Protestantism in Switzerland =

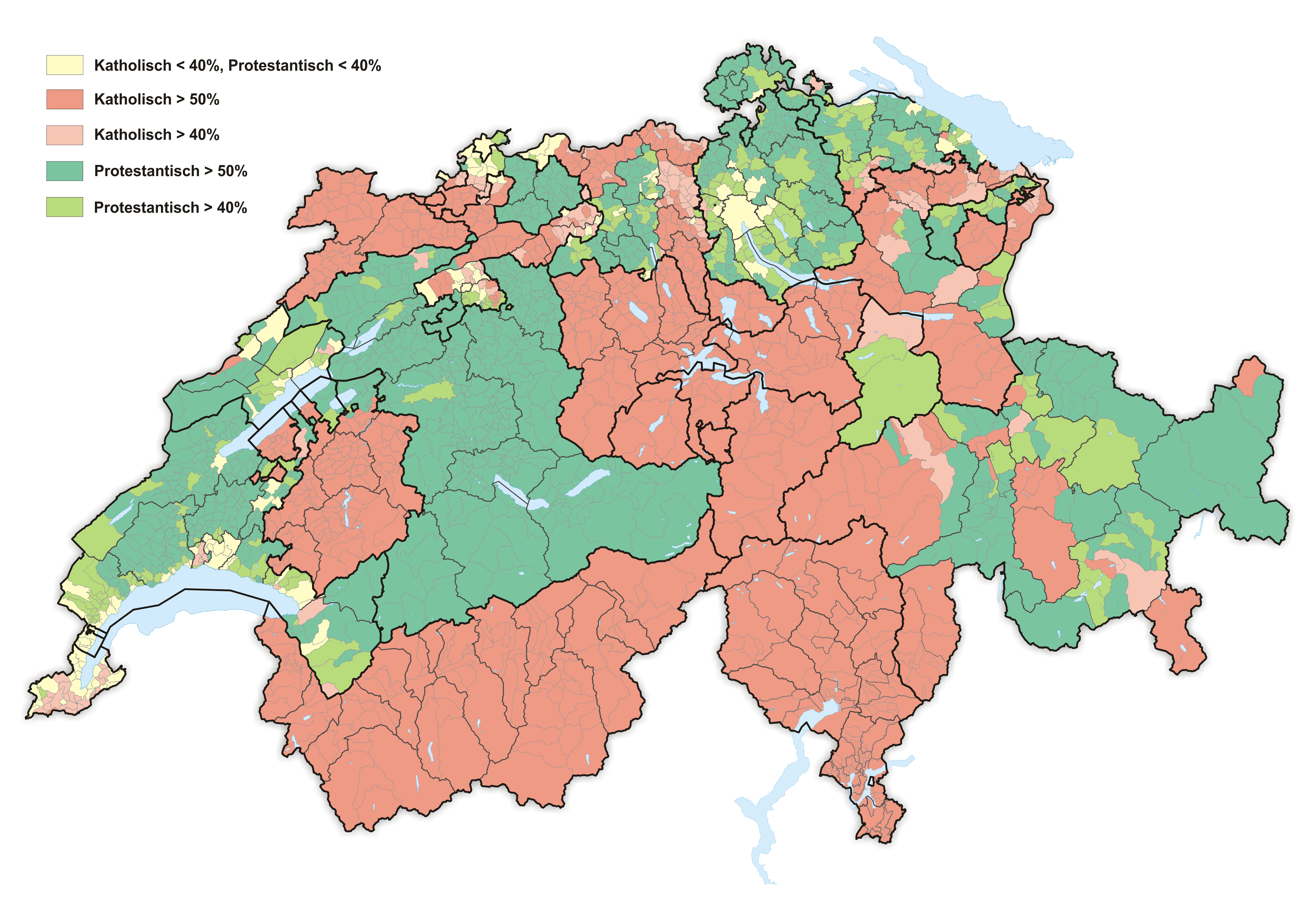
Distribution of denominations in Switzerland in 2017 (green: Protestant, red: Catholic)

The Reformed branch of Protestantism in Switzerland was started in Zürich by Huldrych Zwingli and spread within a few years to Basel (Johannes Oecolampadius), Bern (Berchtold Haller and Niklaus Manuel), St. Gallen,(Joachim Vadian), to cities in southern Germany and via Alsace (Martin Bucer) to France.

Since 1920, the Swiss Reformed Churches have been organized in 26 member churches of the Federation of Swiss Protestant Churches. In the 2000 Swiss census, 33% of Swiss population were reported as registered members of a Reformed cantonal church. By 2022, this was 22.5%, with 2.7% of the populations belonging to other Protestant denominations.

== History ==
After the early death of Zwingli in 1531, his work was continued by Heinrich Bullinger, the love of the Second Helvetic Confession. The French-speaking cities Neuchâtel, Geneva and Lausanne changed to the Reformation ten years later under William Farel and John Calvin coming from France. The Zwingli and Calvin branches had each their theological distinctions, but in 1549 under the lead of Bullinger and Calvin they came to a common agreement in the Consensus Tigurinus (Zürich Consent), and 1566 in the Second Helvetic Confession.

A distinctive feature of the Swiss Reformed churches in the Zwinglian tradition is their historically almost symbiotic link to the state (cantons), which is only loosening gradually in the present.

In 1920, the Federation of Swiss Protestant Churches (Schweizerischer Evangelischer Kirchenbund, Fédération des Eglises protestantes de Suisse, Federazione delle Chiese evangeliche della Svizzera - SEK-FEPS), with 22 member churches - 20 cantonal churches and 2 free churches (Free Church of Geneva and the Evangelical-Methodist Church of Switzerland), was formed to serve as a legal umbrella before the federal government and represent the church in International relations.

== Organization and membership ==
Organizationally, the Reformed Churches in Switzerland remain separate, cantonal units. The German churches are more in the Zwinglian tradition; the French more in the Calvinist tradition - even though both are parts of the Reformed tradition. They are governed synodically and their relation to the respective canton (in Switzerland, there are no church-state regulations at a national level) ranges from independent to close collaboration, depending on historical developments.

== Other Protestant confessions ==
While the vast majority of Protestants in Switzerland adhere to a Reformed confession (Zwinglian or Calvinist), an Anabaptist minority has been present in Switzerland since the Swiss Reformation, organized in the Swiss Mennonite Conference (since 1810) and the Baptist Church (since 1849). A minority Lutheran community has been present since the 19th century, with a Lutheran congregation founded in Basel by immigrant Germans in 1893. During the 20th century, other Lutheran congregations have been founded by immigrants from other nations, a Danish-Lutheran congregation in 1947 and a Swedish-Lutheran one in 1961. Pentecostal Protestantism reached Switzerland from the United States in the early 20th century, and is organized in the Schweizer Pfingstmission (since 1925).

As of 2000, minor Protestant confessions in Switzerland were reported, Methodists (0.12%), other (1.44%).

Zentrum für Migrationskirchen (literally: Centre for migration churches) comprises eight Protestant churches from four continents, situated in the former church hall of the Evangelical Reformed Church of the Canton of Zürich in Zürich-Wipkingen, being a unique centre in Switzerland for the so-called migration churches.

== See also ==
- Religion in Switzerland
- Freedom of religion in Switzerland
- Catholic Church in Switzerland
- Serbian Orthodox Eparchy of Austria and Switzerland
