= Alte Kirche Höngg =

Evangelical church building in Zurich, Switzerland

Coordinates: 47°24′5.53″N 8°29′48.93″E

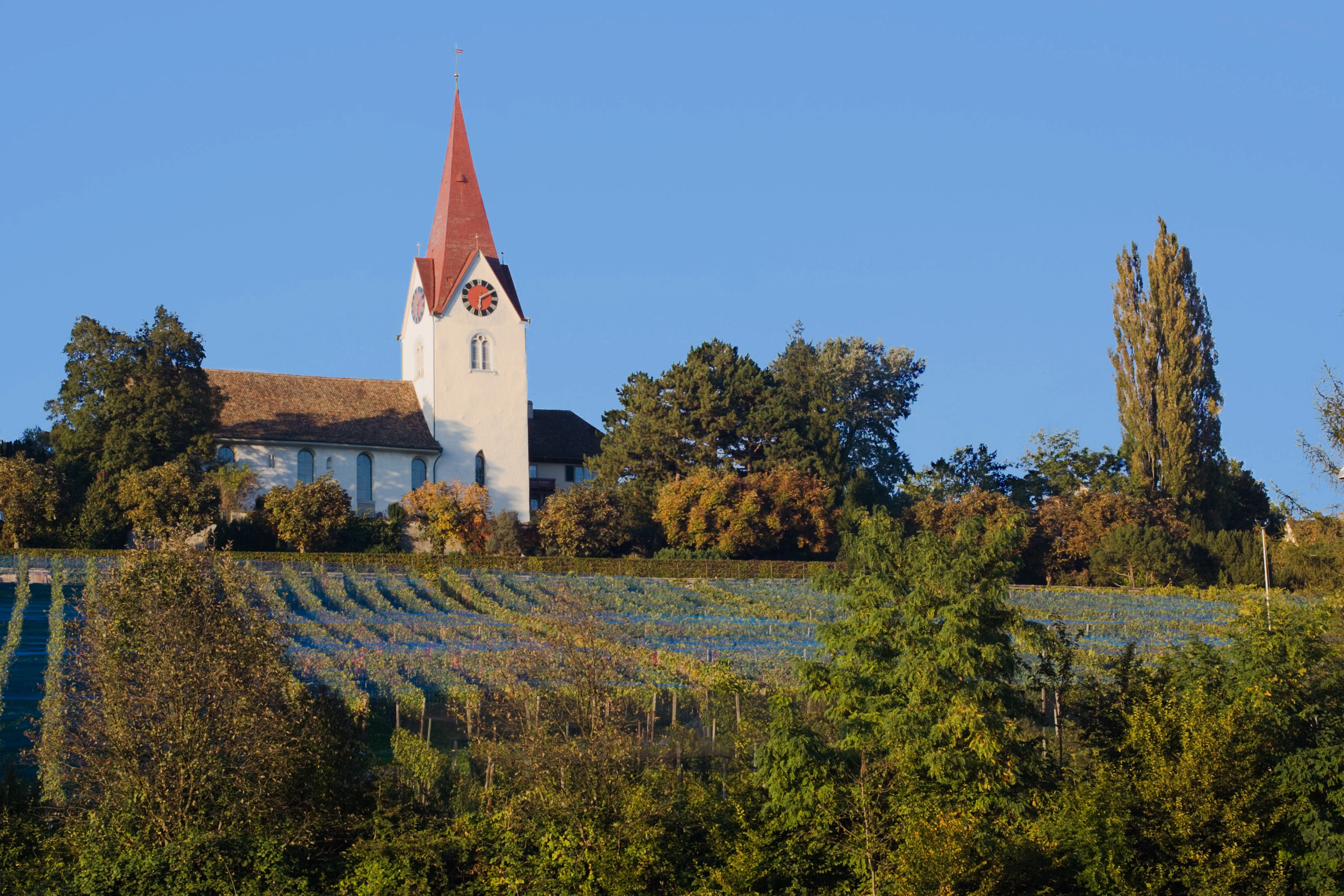
The Reformed church (Alte Kirche Höngg)

The Alte Kirche Höngg (old church of Höngg) is a Reformed church in the district 10 of Zürich. Its congregation forms part of the Evangelical Reformed Church of the Canton of Zürich.

Based on archeological research, the basement of the church relates to the 8/9th century. Therefore, the vineyard on which this church is on top of is a point for people to pray and meet since over 1200 years.

Over the last few centuries, the church has been extended in size and structure before getting the shape it has today. However, at the beginning of the Reformation in 1523 a few local inhabitants removed all the statues and pictures from within the church. It was further in 1863 where the tower roof together with the clock face was renewed.
