= Grossmünster =

Church in Zurich, Switzerland

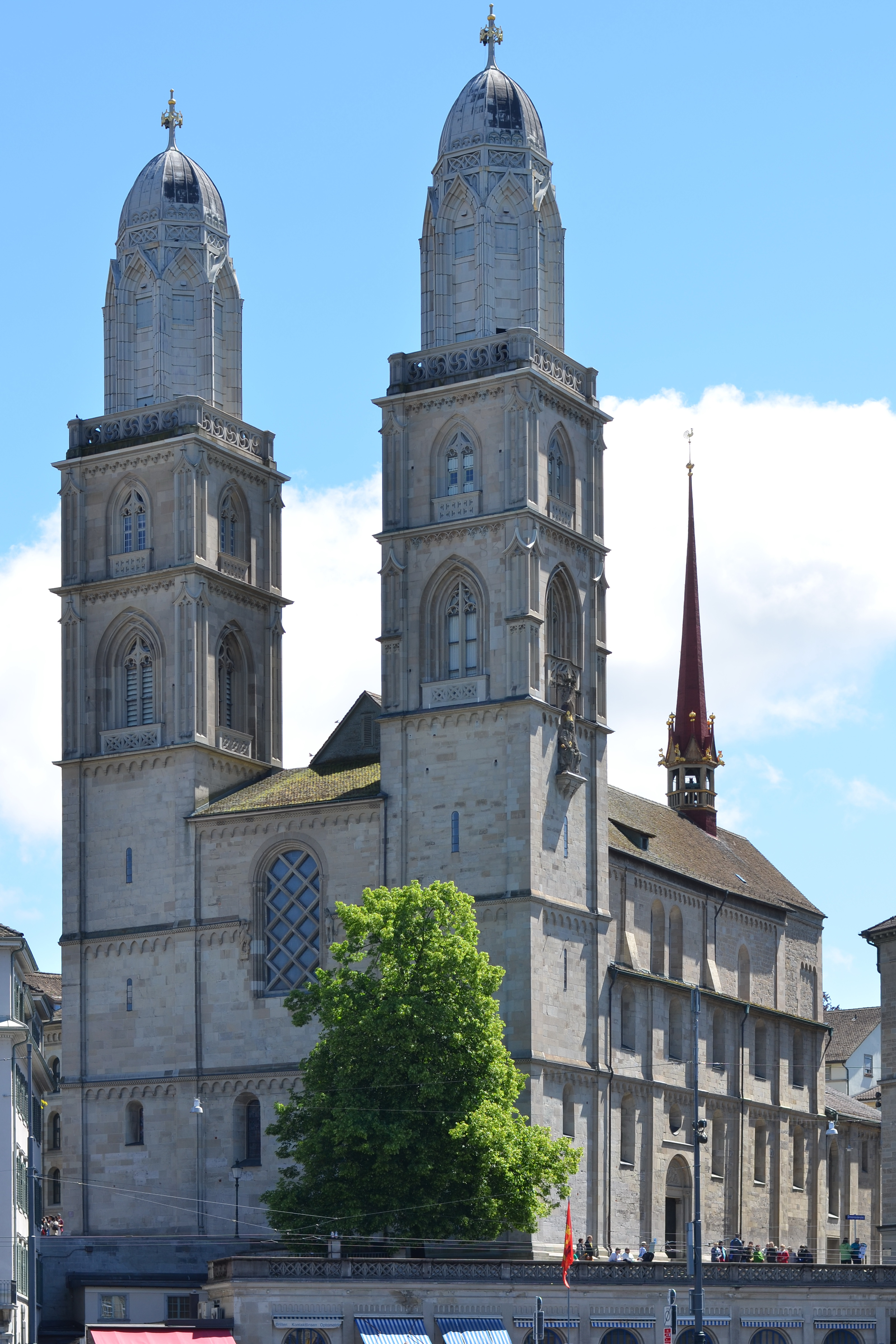
- Grossmünster
- 47°22′13″N 8°32′38″E
- Location: Zurich, Canton of Zurich
- Country: Switzerland
- Denomination: Swiss Reformed
- Previous denomination: Roman Catholic

Architecture
- Style: Romanesque

The Grossmünster (German pronunciation: [ɡʁoːsˈmʏnstɐ]; "great minster") is a Romanesque-style Swiss Reformed Church in Zurich, Switzerland. It is one of the four major churches in the city (the others being the Fraumünster, Predigerkirche, and St. Peterskirche). Its congregation forms part of the Evangelical Reformed Church of the Canton of Zurich. The core of the present building, near the banks of the Limmat, was constructed on the site of a Carolingian church, which was, according to legend, originally commissioned by Charlemagne. Construction of the present structure commenced around 1100 and it was inaugurated around 1220.

The Grossmünster was a monastery church, vying for precedence with the Fraumünster, across the Limmat, throughout the Middle Ages. According to legend, the Grossmünster was founded by Charlemagne, whose horse fell to its knees over the tombs of Felix, Regula, and Exuperantius, Zurich’s patron saints. The legend helps support a claim of seniority over the Fraumünster, which was founded by Louis the German, Charlemagne's grandson. Archaeological evidence confirms the presence of a Roman burial ground at the site.

== Historical significance ==
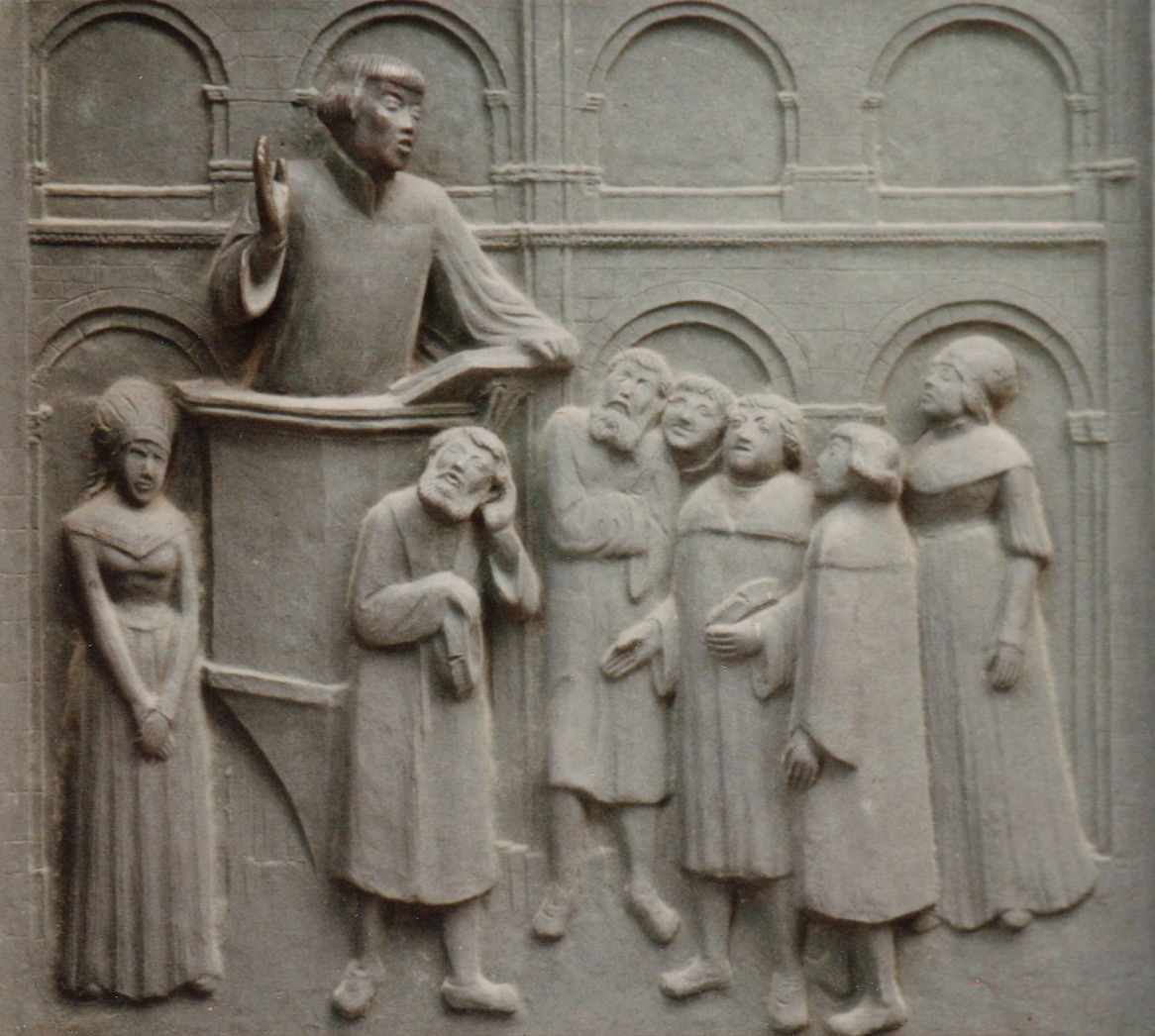
Zwingli on the bronze doors by Otto Münch (1935)

Huldrych Zwingli initiated the Swiss-German Reformation in Switzerland from his pastoral office at the Grossmünster, starting in 1520. Zwingli won a series of debates presided over by the magistrate in 1523 which ultimately led local civil authorities to sanction the severance of the church from the papacy. The reforms initiated by Zwingli and continued by his successor, Heinrich Bullinger, account for the plain interior of the church. The iconoclastic reformers removed the organ and religious statuary in 1524. These changes, accompanied by abandonment of Lent, replacement of the Mass, disavowal of celibacy, eating meat on fast days, replacement of the lectionary with a seven-year New Testament cycle, a ban on church music, and other significant reforms make this church one of the most important sites in the history of the reformation and the birthplace of the Swiss-German reformation.

== Burials ==
- Saints Felix and Regula
- Conrad Gessner
- Peter Martyr Vermigli

== Architecture ==
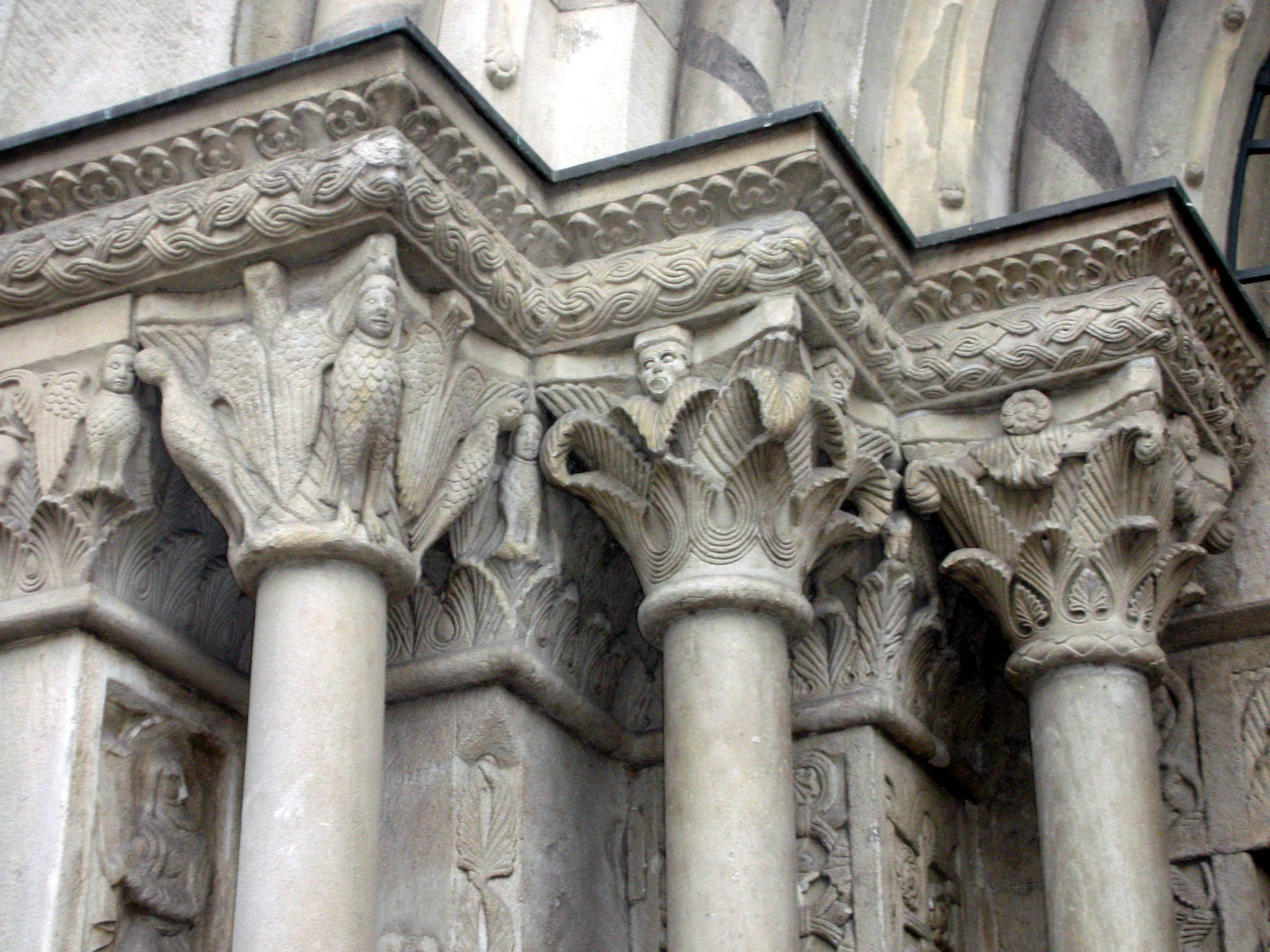
Capitals with grotesques in the grand south portal

The twin towers of the Grossmünster are regarded as perhaps the most recognized landmark in Zurich. Architecturally, the church is considered Romanesque in style and thus a part of the first pan-European architectural trend since Imperial Roman architecture. In keeping with the Romanesque architectural style, Grossmünster offers a great carved portal featuring medieval columns with grotesques adorning the capitals. A Romanesque crypt dates to the 11th and 13th centuries.

Bollinger Sandstein was used for the construction. The two towers were first erected between 1487 and 1492. Originally, they had high wooden steeples, which were destroyed by fire in 1763, following which the present neo-Gothic tops were added (completed 1787). Richard Wagner is known to have mocked the church's appearance as that of two pepper dispensers. The church now features modern stained-glass windows by Swiss artist Augusto Giacometti added in 1932. Ornate bronze doors in the north and south portals by Otto Münch were added in 1935 and 1950.

The church houses a Reformation museum in the cloister. The annex to the cloister houses the theological school of the University of Zurich.

== Gallery ==
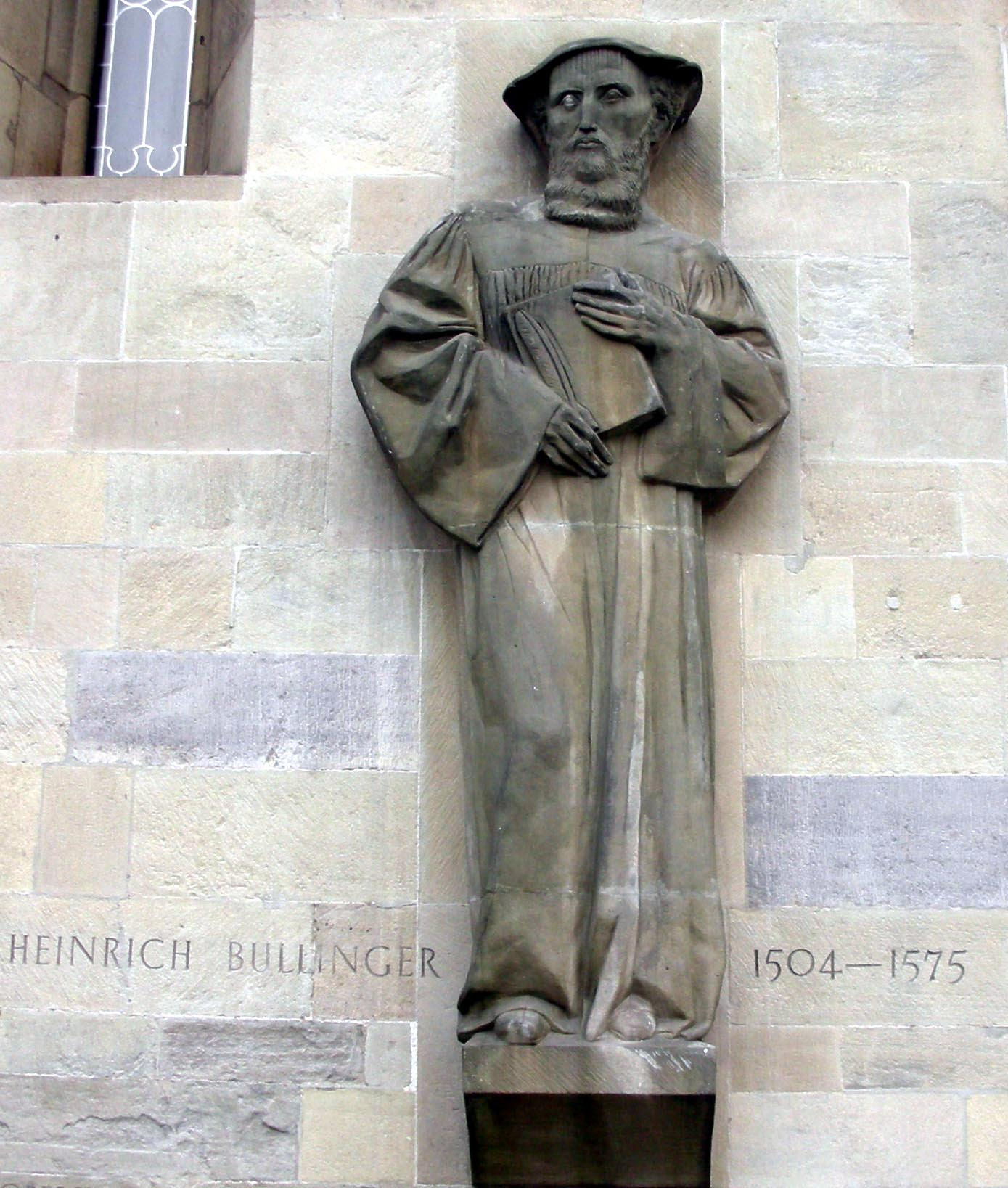
Statuary relief of Heinrich Bullinger on the southern exterior wall

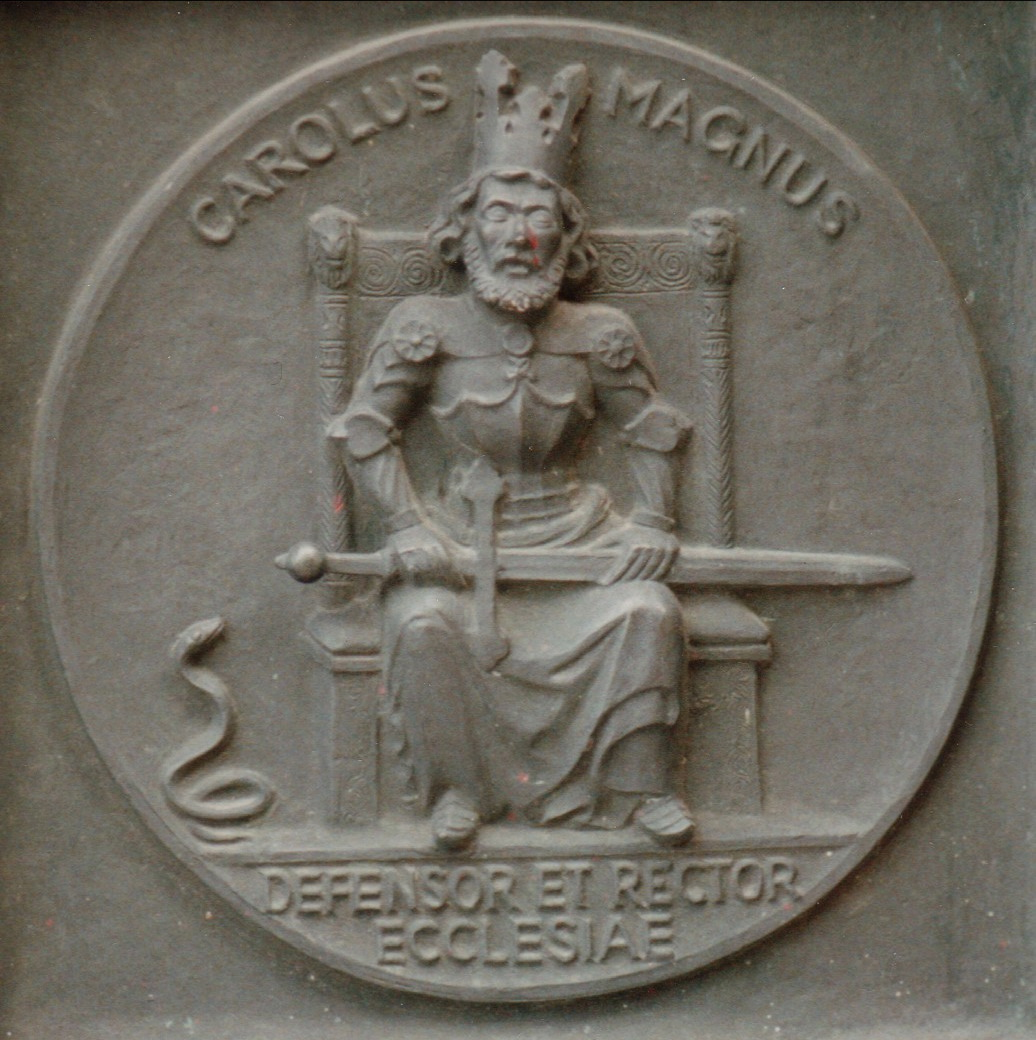
Charlemagne on the bronze doors by Münch (1935)

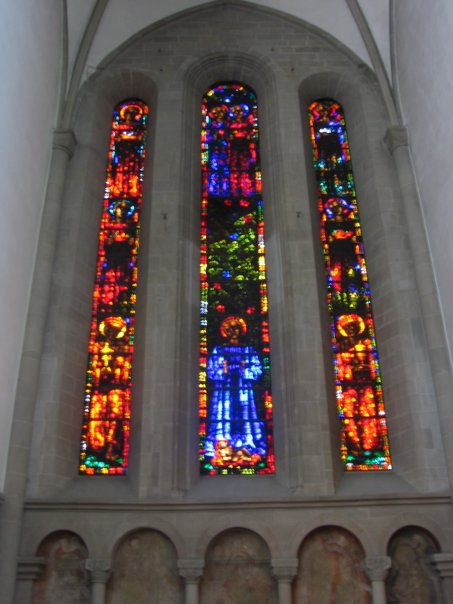
Stained Glass from inside the church by Swiss artist Augusto Giacometti added in 1932

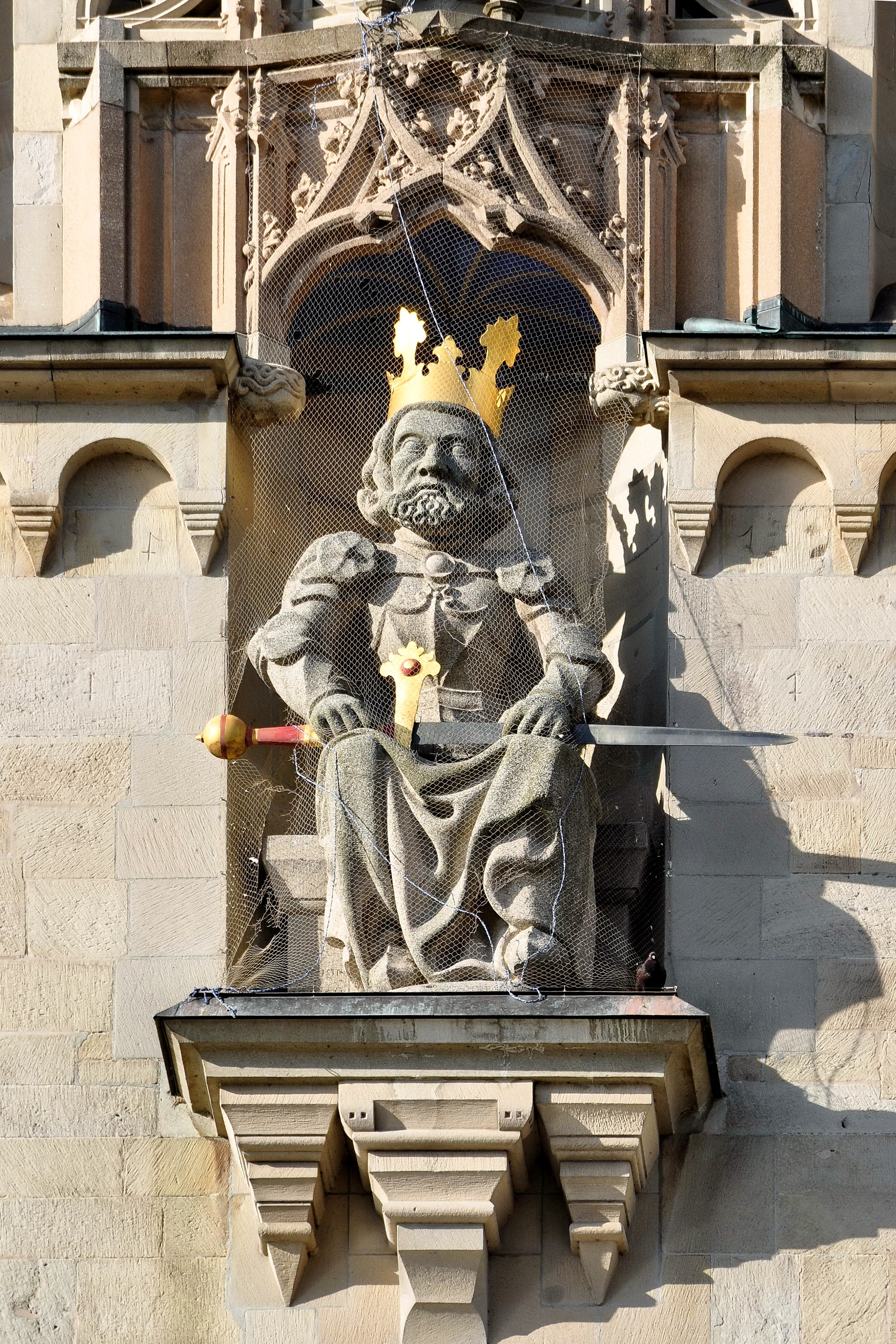
Charlemagne 'sitting' at the southern tower, the so-called Karlsturm

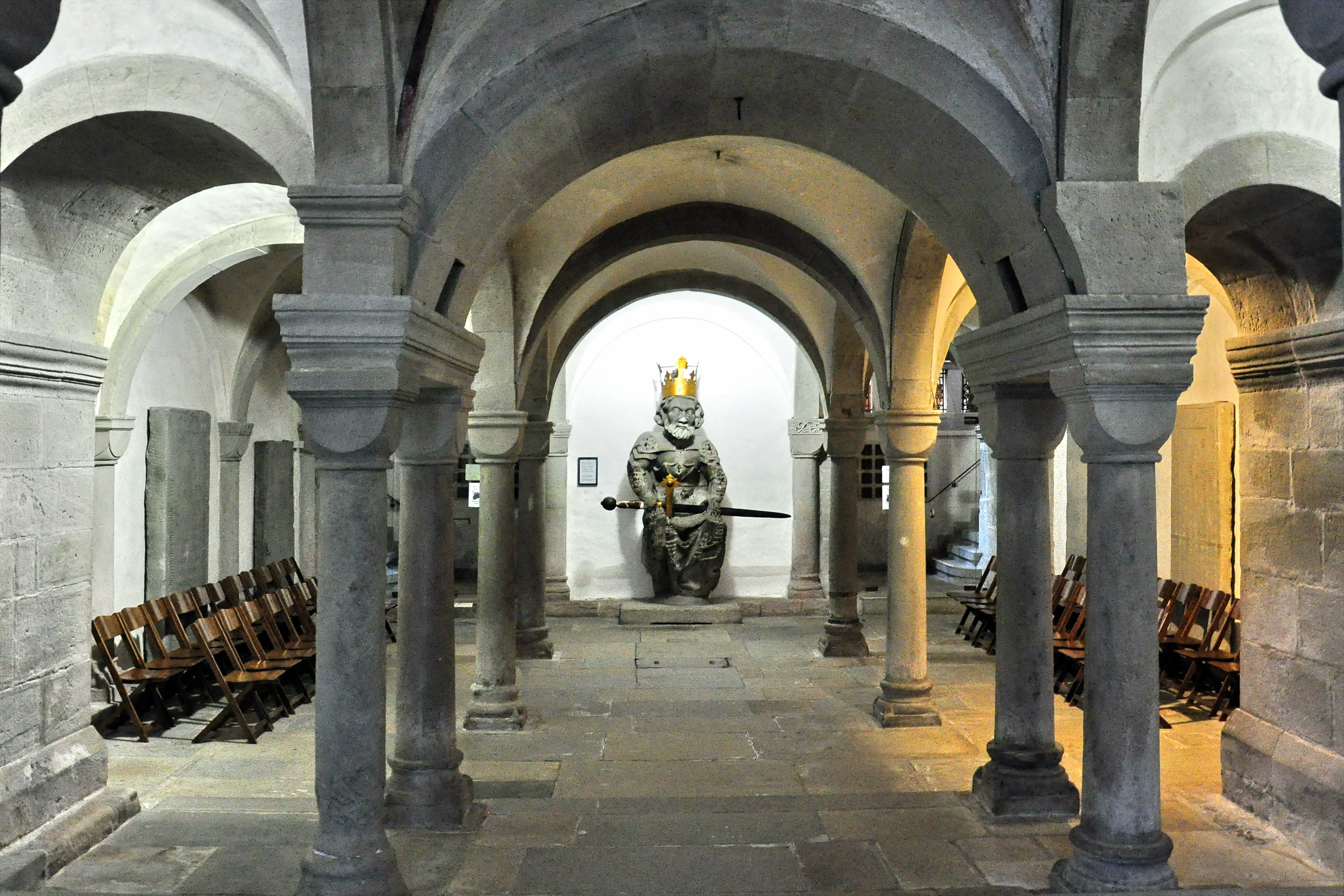
Crypt with original Charlemagne statue (15th century)

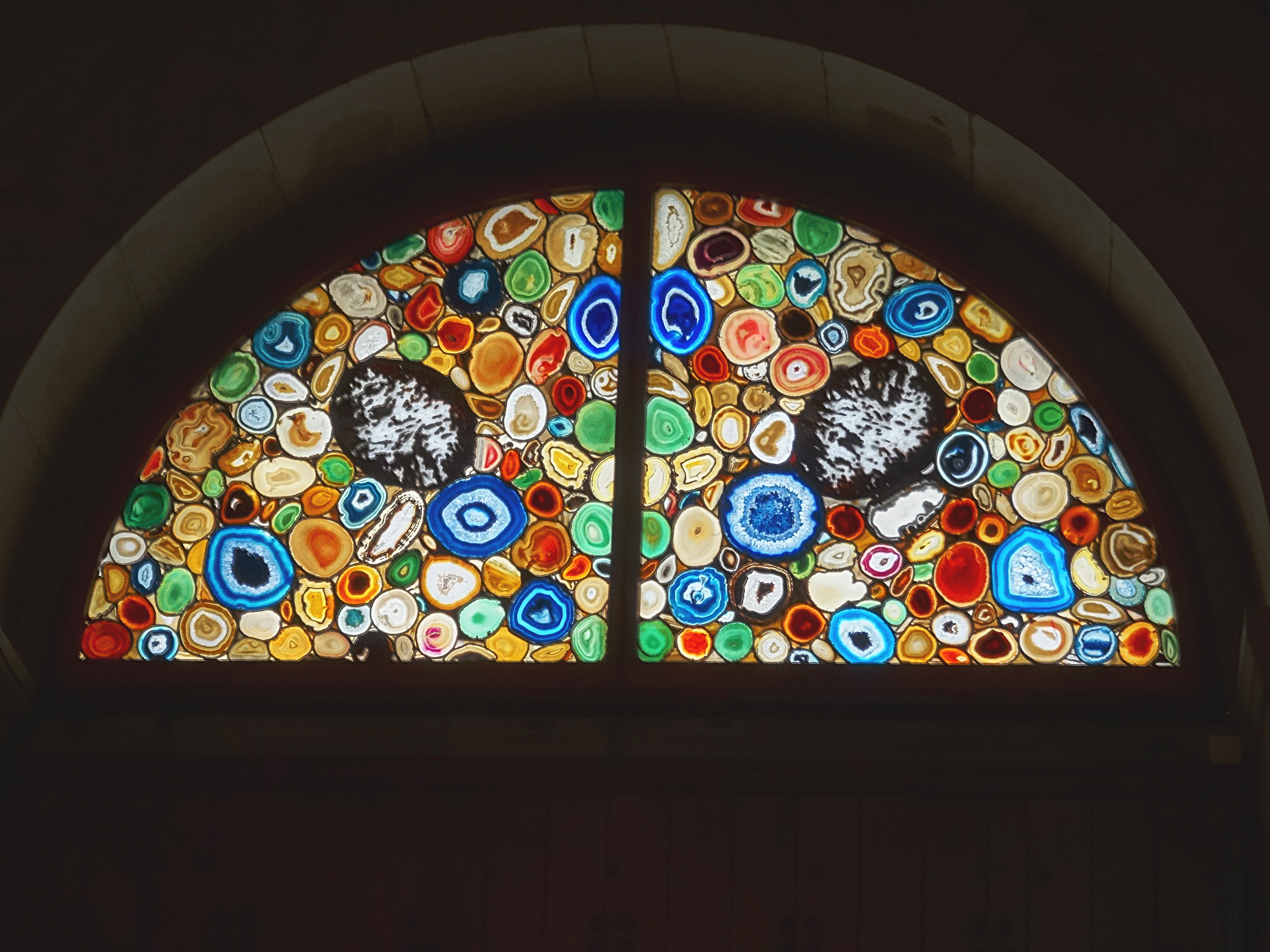
Stained glass windows created by Sigmar Polke in 2009

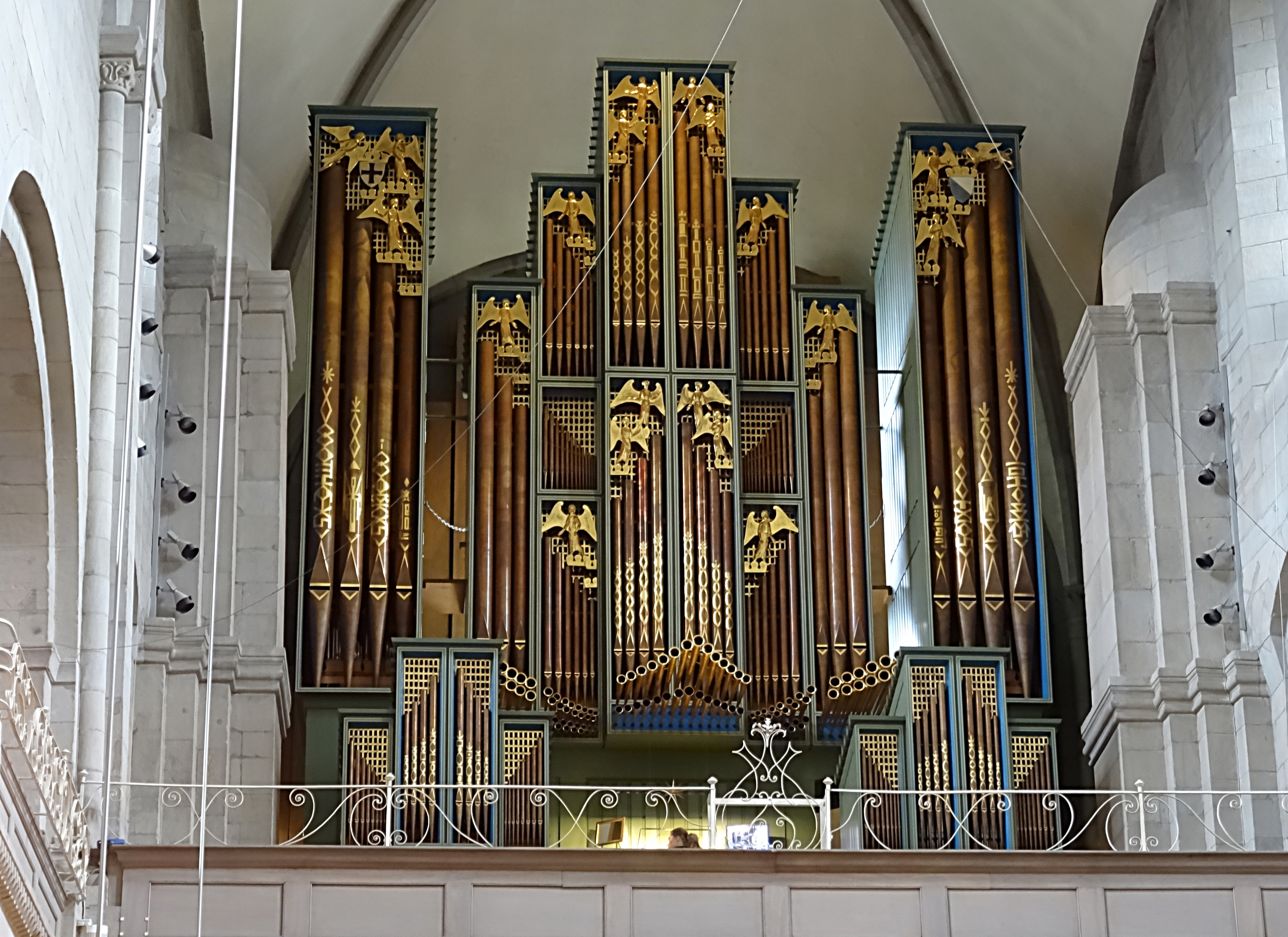
Metzler-Organ made 1960

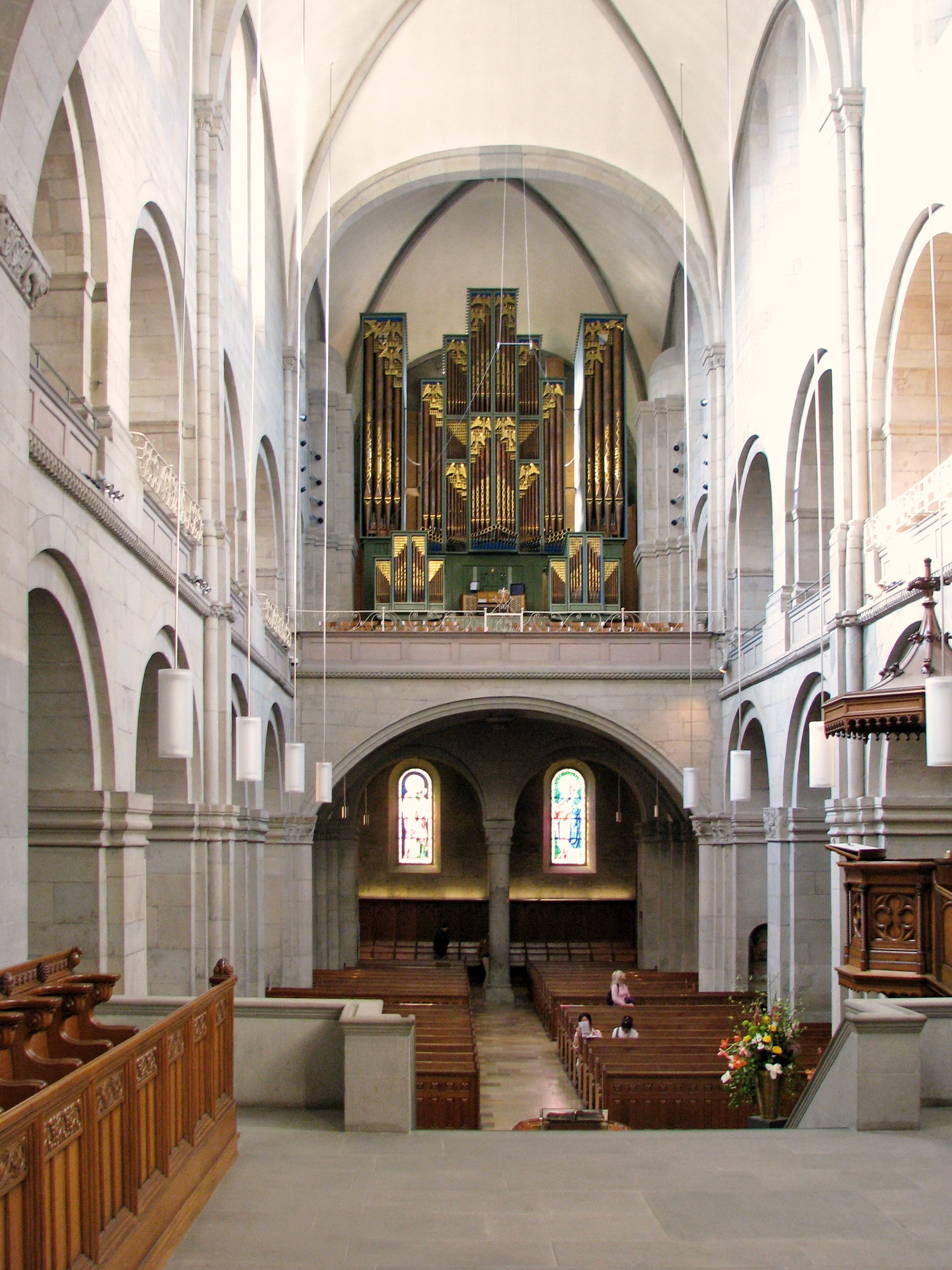
Nave, sight to the Chorus

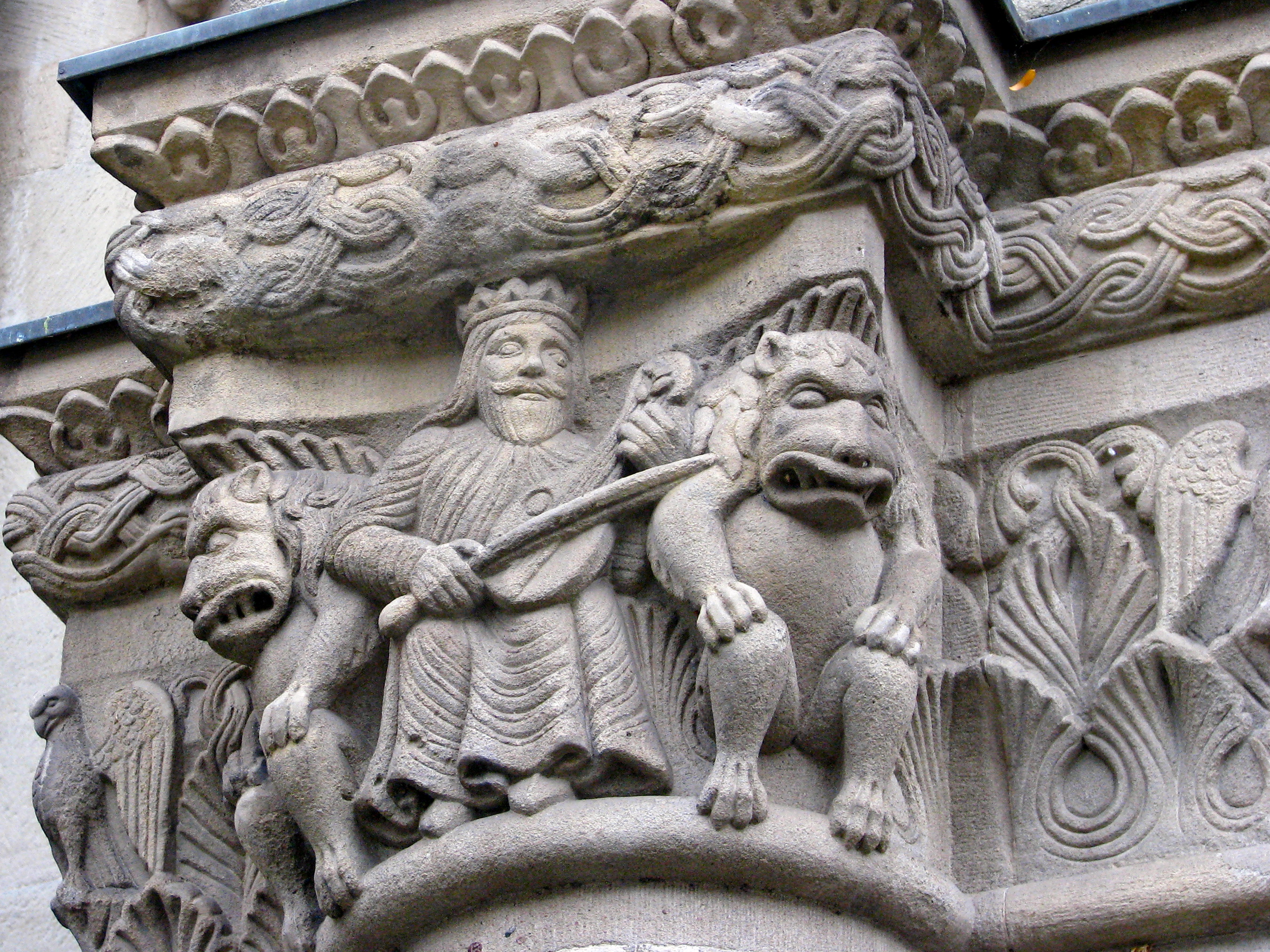
Reliefs (portal, left side)

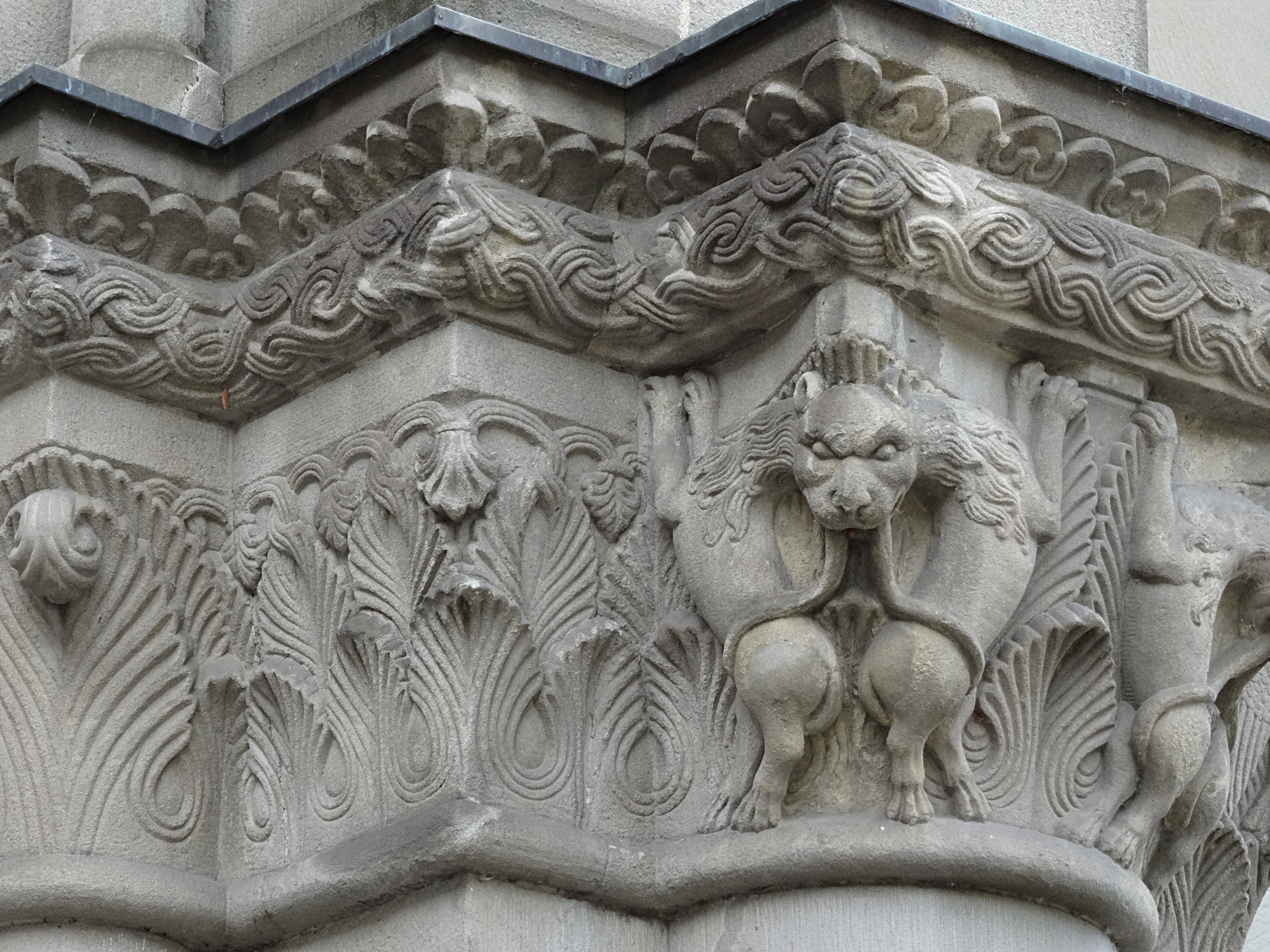
Reliefs (portal, right side)

== Cloister ==
The cloister of former Grossmünster Chorherrenstift dates from the late 12th century AD and was part of the canons (Chorherrenstift) which was repealed in 1832, and gave place of the girls' school Carolinum. The cloister was dismantled and integrated into the new building those reconstruction was based on the original elements of the architecture, but includes numerous interpretations. The cloister was renewed in 2009, its sandstone elements were cleaned, and the interior garden redesigned in cooperation with the foundation ProSpecieRara. The compilation of the cultural and historical ornamental plants is inspired by the natural scientist and polymath Conrad Gessner who found his final resting place in the cloister.

== Carolinum and Heritage site of national significance ==
The Grossmünster church building is owned by the Canton of Zurich, and the annex building being the former cloister, however, is in the property of the city of Zurich. It is leased to the Theological faculty of the University of Zurich since 1976. The as of today faculty building was built by Gustav Albert Wegmann in 1843. Grossmünster and Carolinum are listed in the Swiss inventory of cultural property of national and regional significance as a Class A object of national importance.
