= Höngg =

Quarter of the city of Zurich, Switzerland

- Quarter
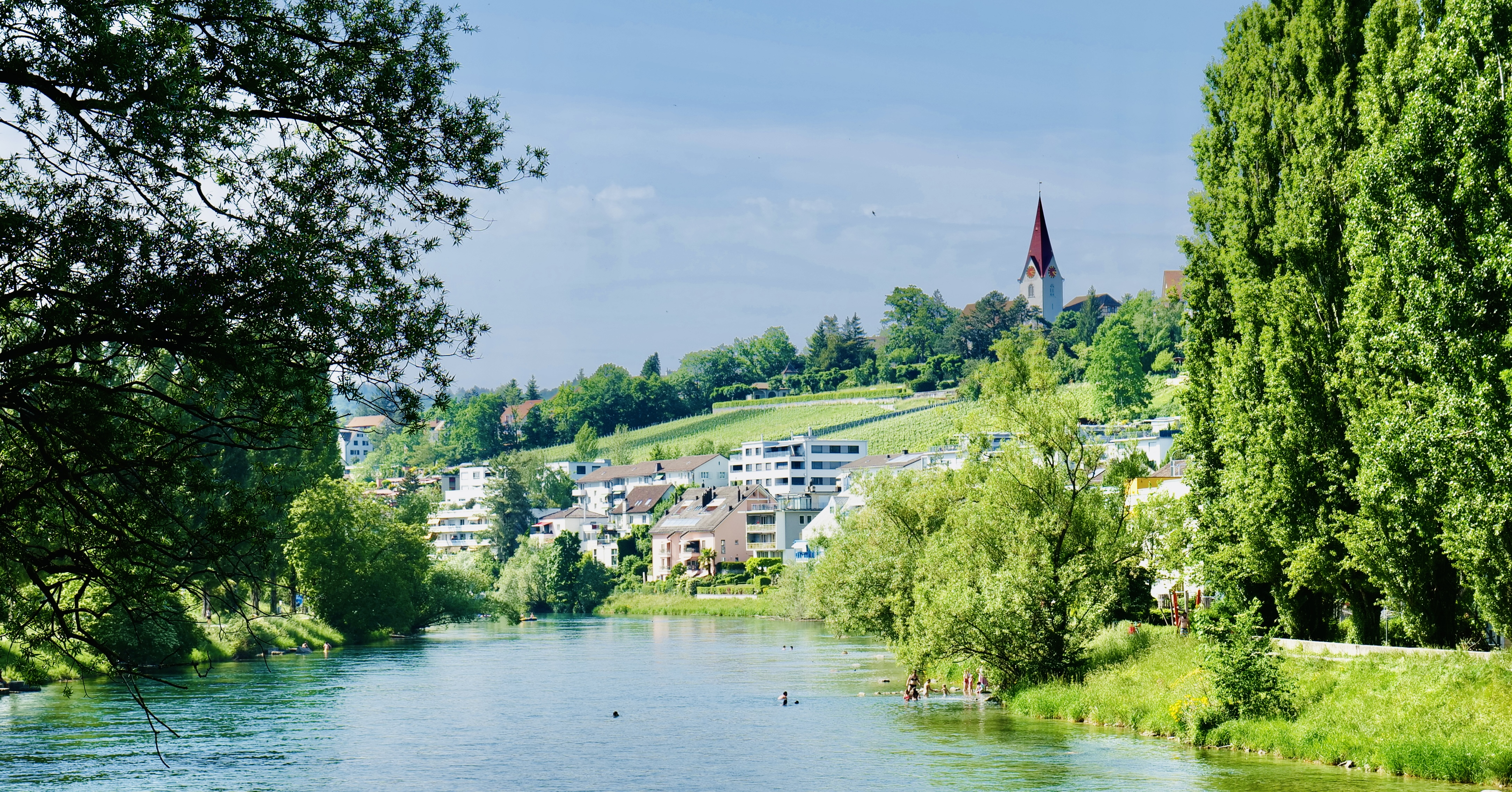

- Flag Coat of arms

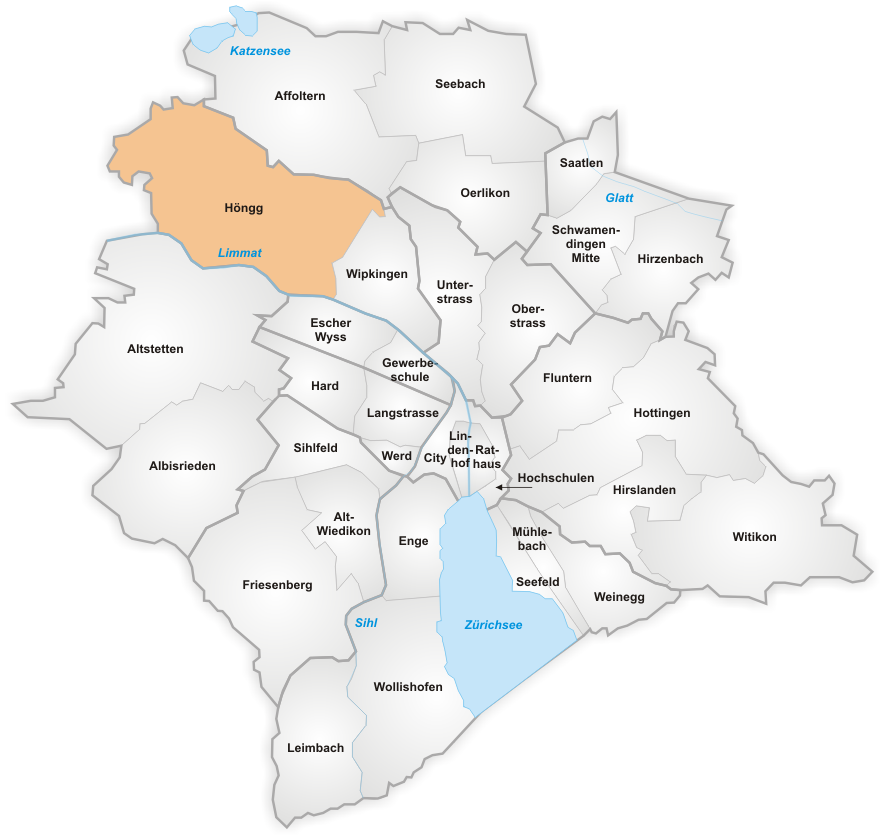
- The quarter of Höngg in Zurich
- Coordinates: 47°24′14″N 8°29′47″E
- Country: Switzerland
- Canton: Zurich
- City: Zurich
- District: 10

Höngg is a quarter in district 10 in Zürich.

It was formerly a municipality of its own, having been incorporated into Zürich in 1934.

As of 2024, the quarter has a population of 24,810, distributed across an area of 6.98 km^{2}.

Höngg is renowned for its funfairs, such as the Wümmetfest and the Räbeliechtli Umzug.

The Protestant church Alte Kirche Höngg is the main church of Höngg.

== Sport ==
SV Höngg is the quarter's football team.

== Werdinsel ==
Werdinsel, also known as Limmatauen Werdhölzli, is an island and protected area in the Limmat, to the west of the Europabrücke.

== Gallery ==
Aerial view from 300 m by Walter Mittelholzer (1931)
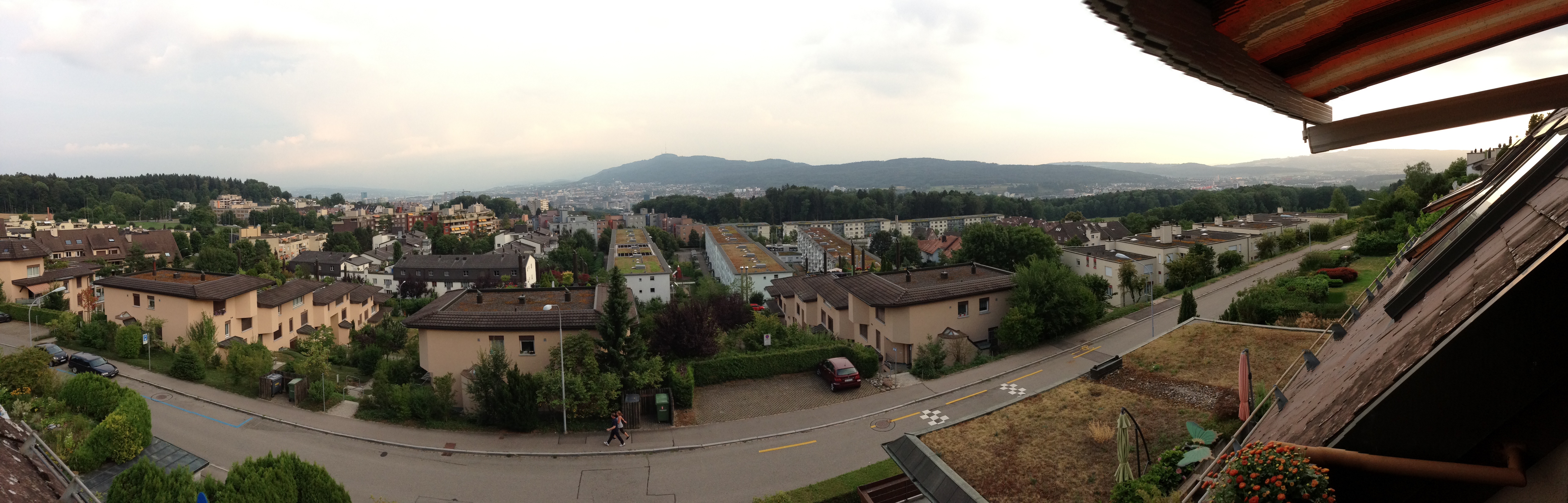
A view south from Höngg to downtown Zürich
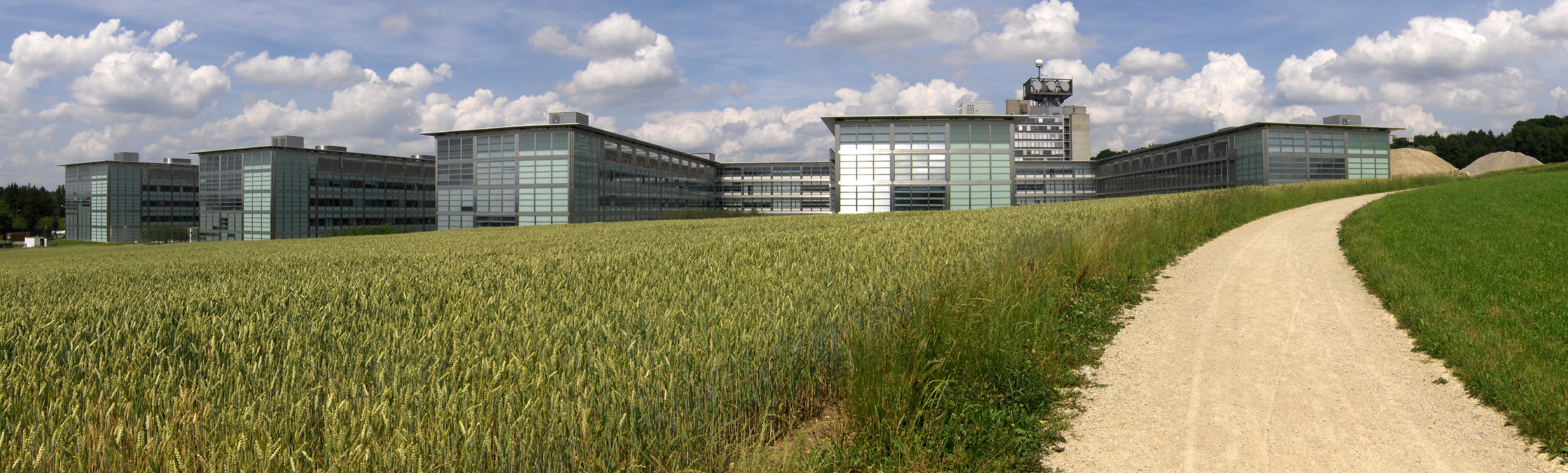
Swiss Federal Institute of Technology Zurich
