= Wipkingen =

Quarter of the city of Zurich, Switzerland

Coordinates: 47°23′33.61″N 8°31′24.34″E

- Quarter
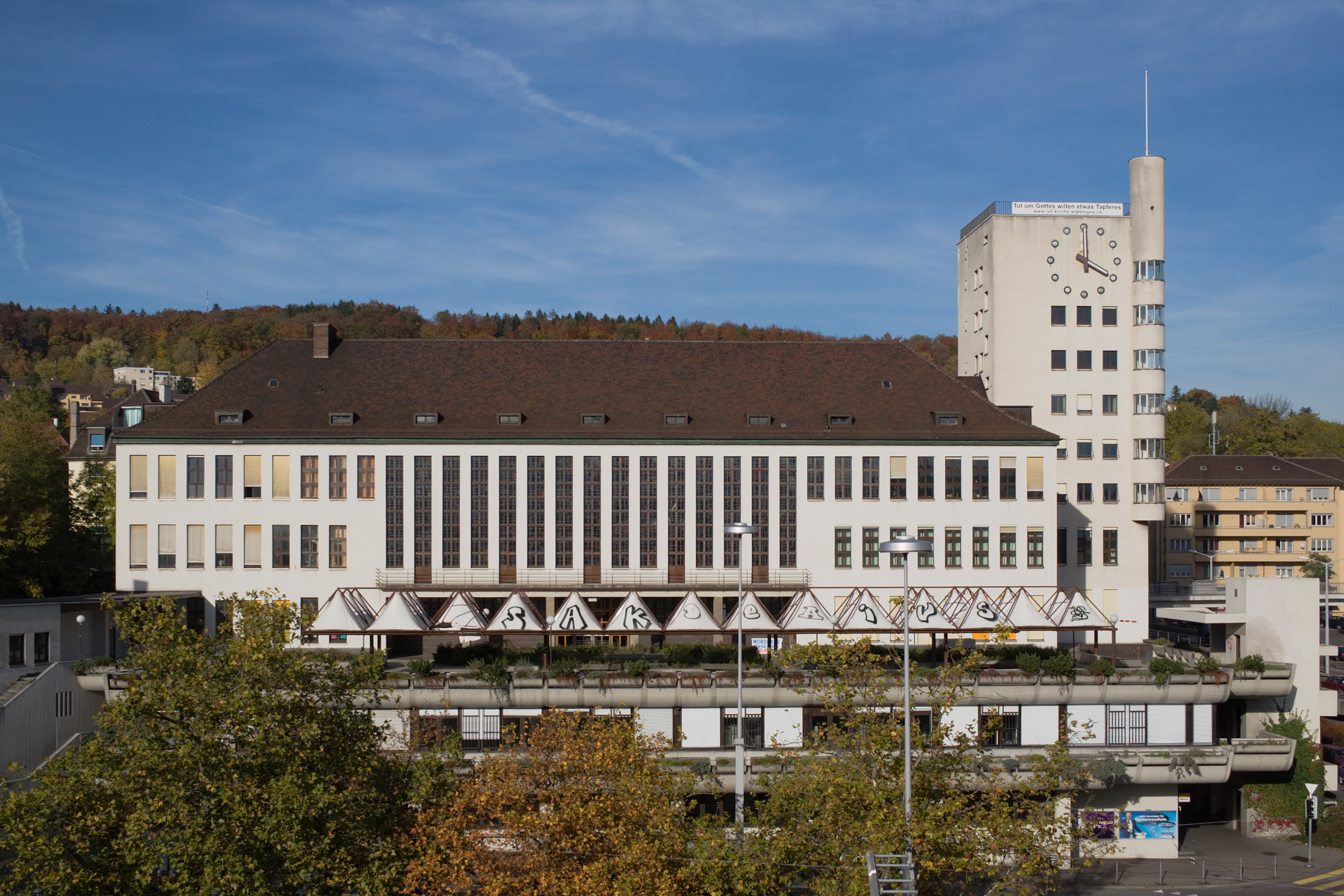
- Community hall (Kirchgemeindehaus Haus für das Volk) at the Limmat, locality of the Zentrum für Migrationskirchen

- Flag Coat of arms

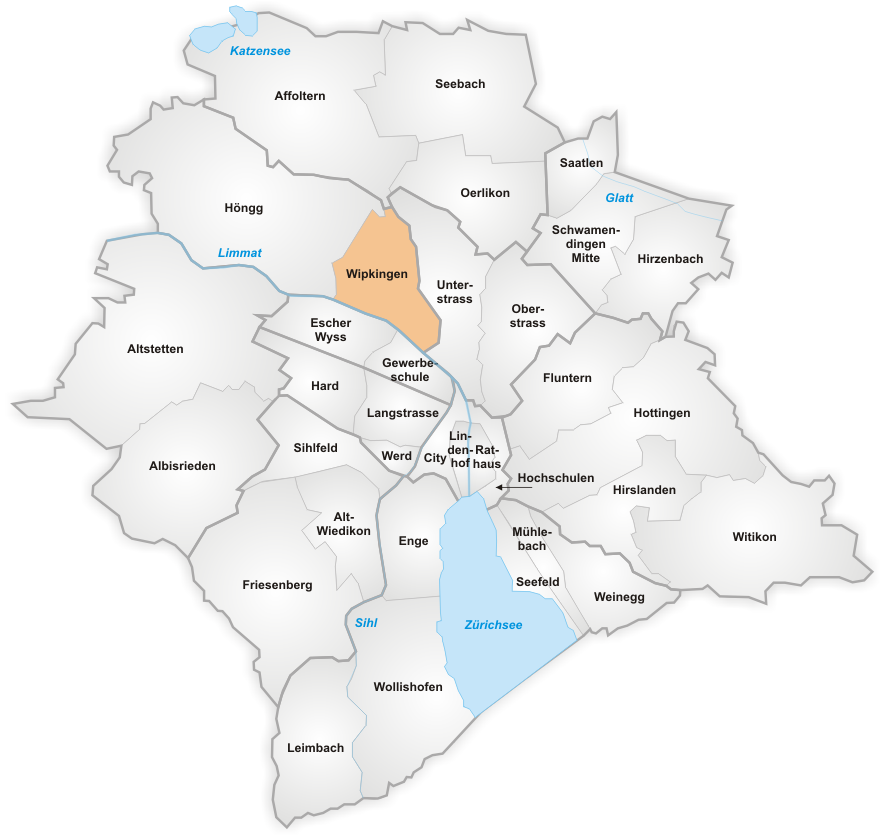
- The quarter of Wipkingen in Zurich
- Country: Switzerland
- Canton: Zurich
- City: Zurich
- District: 10

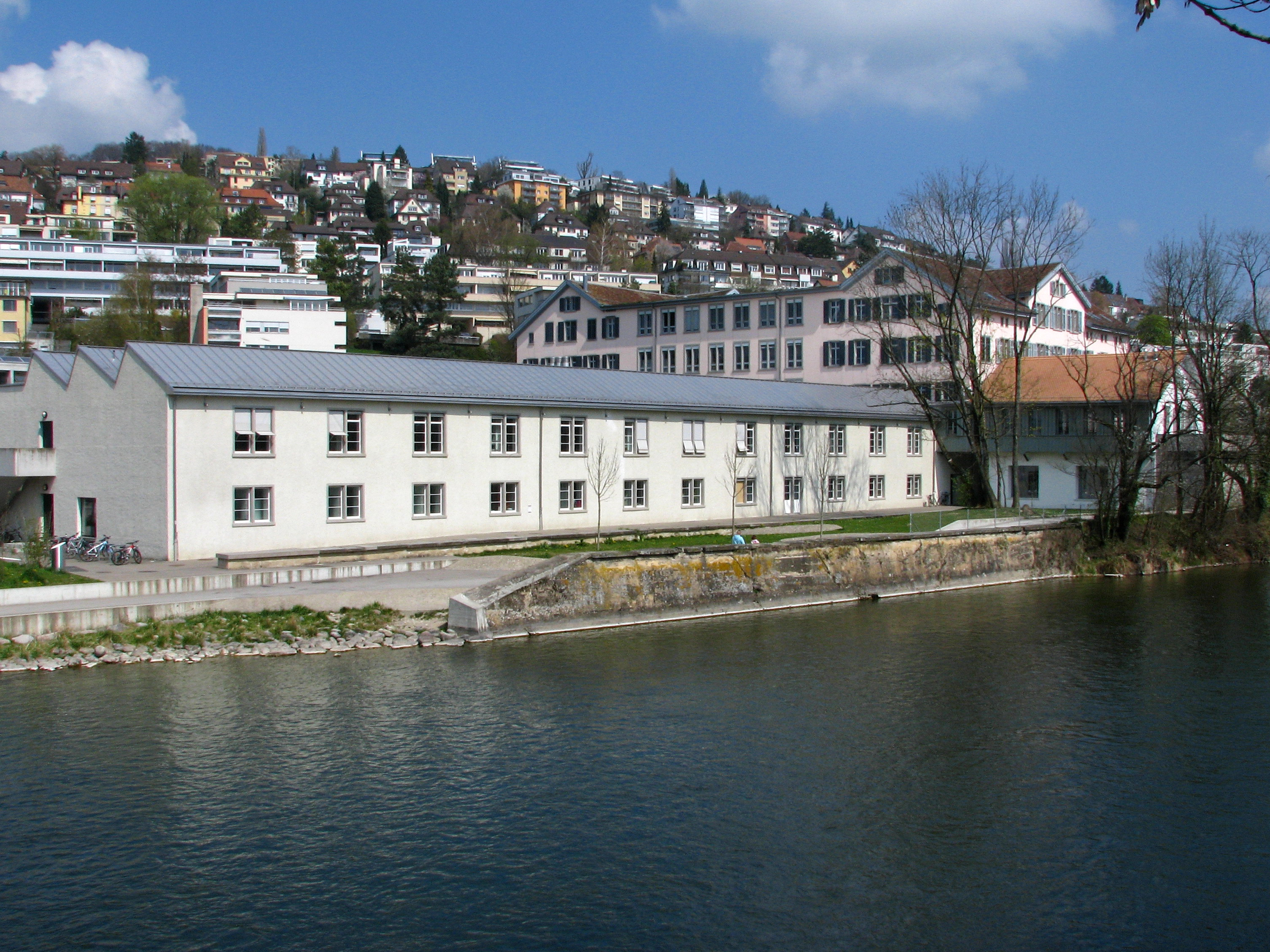
The Limmat in Wipkingen

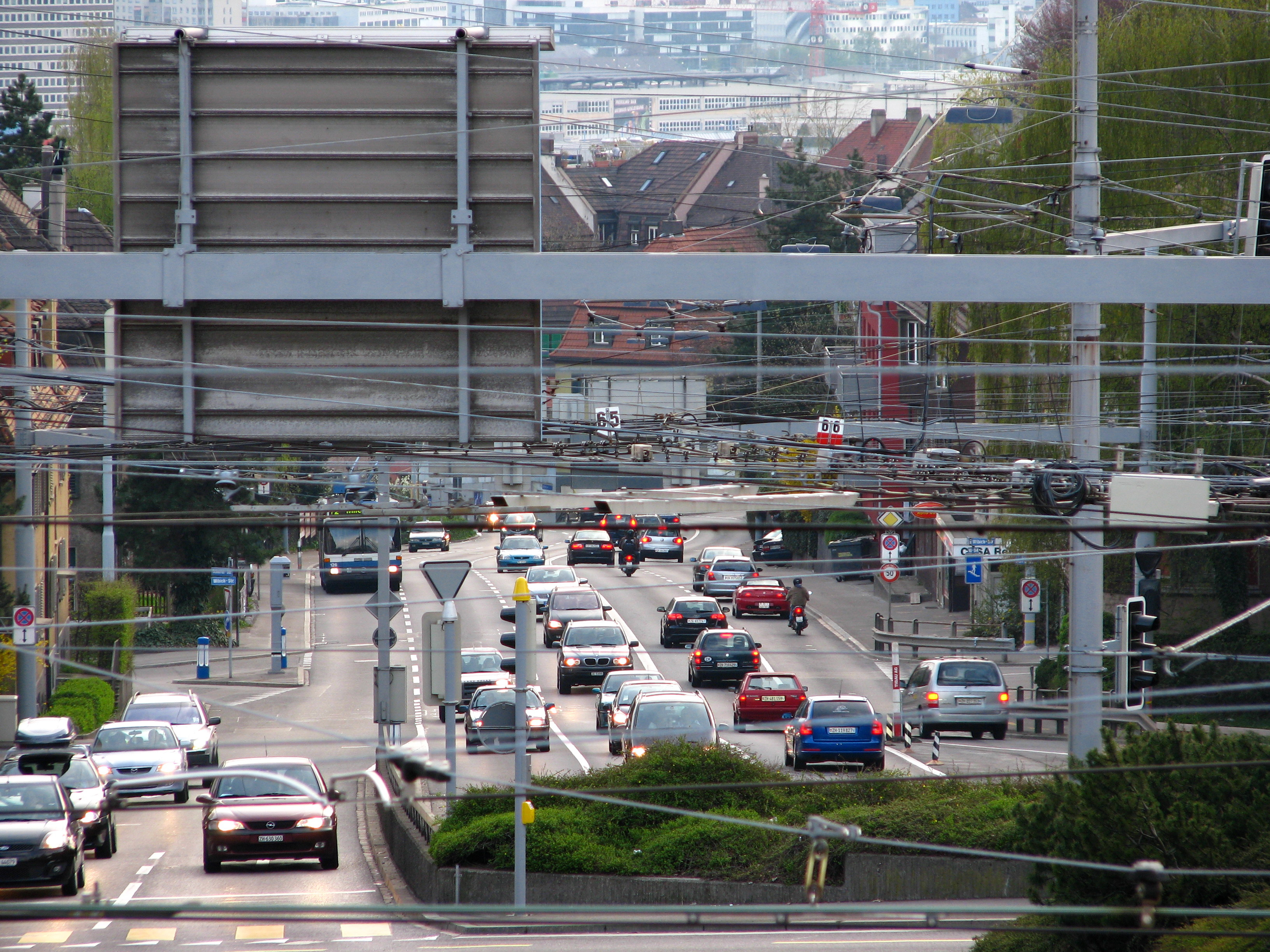
Rosengartenstrasse, seen from Bucheggplatz

Several trains passing through Wipkingen tunnel

Wipkingen is a quarter in the district 10 in Zürich.

It was formerly a municipality of its own, having been incorporated into Zürich in 1893.

As of 2025, the quarter has a population of 16,734 distributed on an area of 2.10 km^{2} (0.81 sq mi).

Zentrum für Migrationskirchen (literally: Centre for migration churches) comprises eight Protestant churches from four continents, situated in the former church hall of the Evangelical Reformed Church of the Canton of Zürich in Zürich-Wipkingen, being a unique centre in Switzerland for the so-called migration churches.

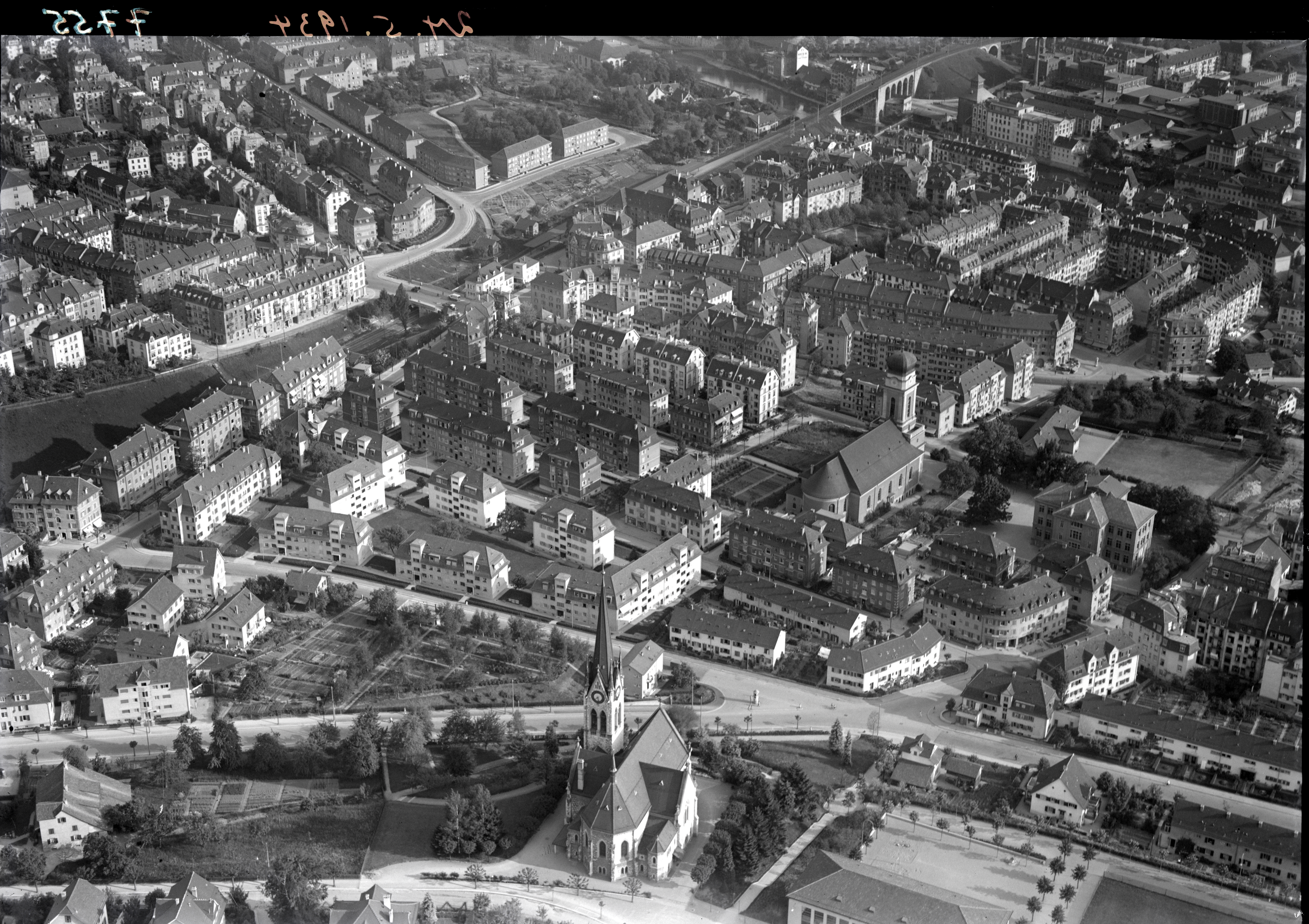
Aerial view from 400 m by Walter Mittelholzer (1934)

== Transportation ==
Zurich Wipkingen railway station is a stop of Zürich S-Bahn line S24. The station is a 3-minute ride from Zürich Hauptbahnhof.
