= Otto Münch =

German artist (1885-1965)

- Born: Ernst Otto Münch; 23 October 1885; Meissen, Saxony, Germany
- Died: 26 January 1965 (aged 79); Zurich, Switzerland
- Occupation: Sculptor
- Known for: Zwingli and Bible doors at the Grossmünster in Zurich
- Spouse: Maria Münch-Winkel

Otto Münch (1885–1965) was a German-born Swiss sculptor best known for the Zwingli and Bible bronze doors at the Grossmünster in Zurich. His work also included architectural decoration, reliefs, fountains and public sculpture.

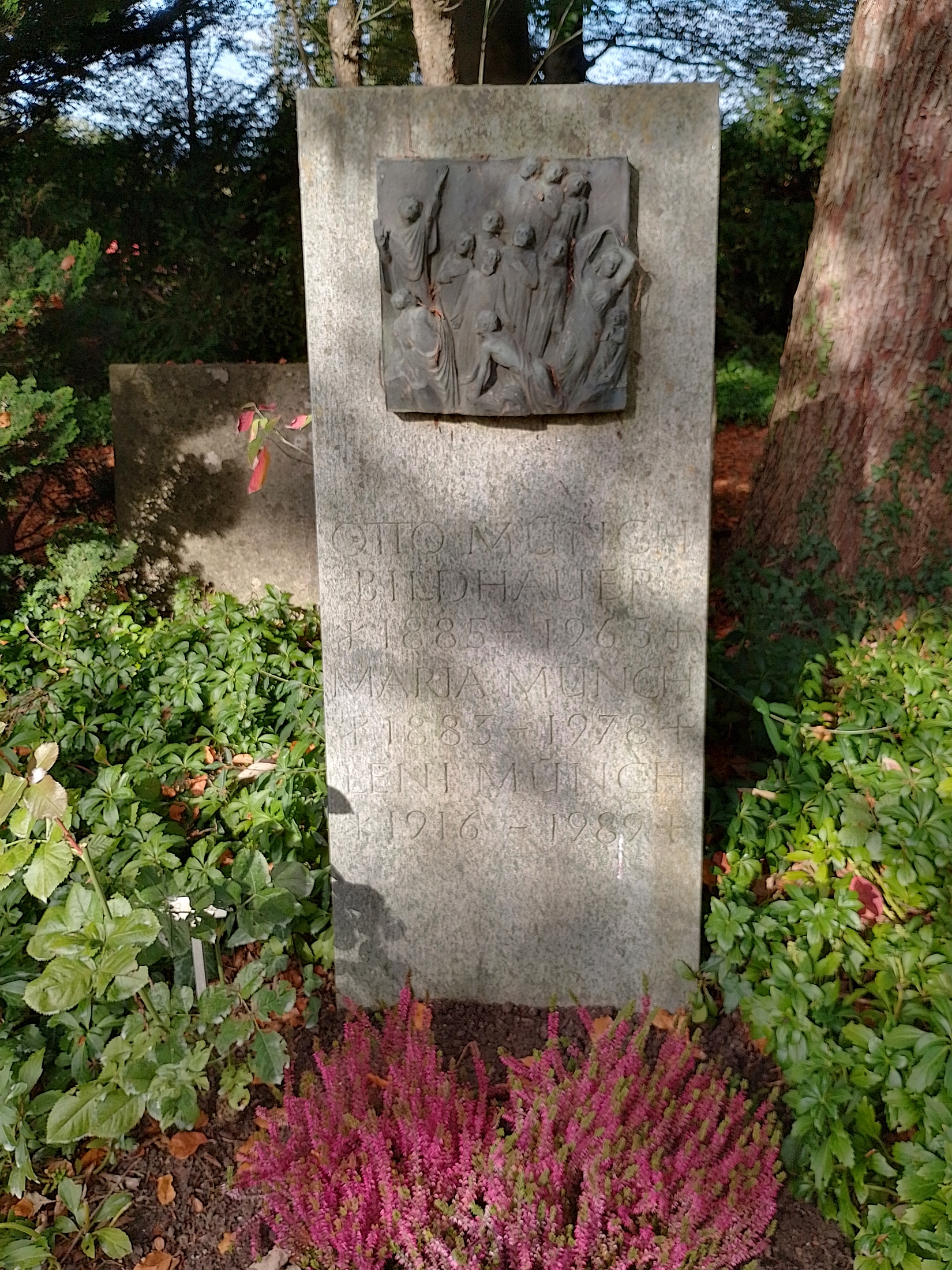
Münch family grave at Enzenbühl Cemetery, Zurich

== Biography ==
Otto Münch was born on 23 October 1885 in Meissen, Saxony. He trained there as a woodcarver from 1900 to 1904 and continued his education in stucco work and sculpture until 1907. From 1907 to 1911, he attended the Kunstgewerbeschule Dresden, where he studied under the sculptor Karl Gross and the architect Wilhelm Kreis.

Münch moved to Zurich in 1911. After his arrival, he worked for the architectural firm Bollert & Herter and moved into a studio formerly occupied by Arnold Böcklin. In 1912, he began working independently as a sculptor and married Maria Helene Winkel. From 1913 to 1945, the couple ran a school of sculpture and applied arts in Zurich.

During the 1920s, Münch became a member of the Swiss Werkbund. He also spent an extended period travelling in Italy in 1922. A German national by birth, he became a citizen of Zurich in 1923. He joined the Gesellschaft Schweizerischer Maler, Bildhauer und Architekten in 1943 and belonged to the artists’ association Oktogon from 1950 to 1954. Münch died in Zurich on 26 January 1965.

== Work ==
Münch was a sculptor who also worked in modelling and stucco. His work for architectural settings included facade decoration, interior decoration, fountains and sculpture for public spaces. In the 1910s and 1920s, Münch designed stucco and architectural decoration in historical styles for public buildings. His commissions included work for the Schweizerische Unfallversicherung in Lucerne, the Kantonalbank in Herisau and the Swiss National Bank in Zurich.

Ornamental low relief was one of Münch’s specialities. He used formal elements derived from classical antiquity, the Renaissance and Neoclassicism. His practice later expanded to include freestanding sculpture, fountains and bronze reliefs.

In 1930, Münch completed stone reliefs for the main entrance of the Milchbuck school in Zurich. The individual panels extend across the entrance columns and show scenes connected with education and physical activity, including music, running and skipping. Their simplified forms have been compared to hieroglyphs.

=== Grossmünster ===
Between 1933 and 1936, he oversaw the restoration of the Romanesque sculpture at the Grossmünster in Zurich. He later created the Zwingli door from 1935 to 1939 and the Bible door from 1944 to 1950. Both bronze doors use an Expressionist visual language influenced by medieval art. The doors are considered among his principal works and established his reputation for reinterpreting medieval sculptural traditions.

The Zwingli door, completed for the south portal in 1939, contains 24 square reliefs arranged in six rows of four. Most depict episodes from Zwingli’s life and the Reformation, while the upper central panels contain statuettes of Reformers and the corner panels display seals and coats of arms.

The Bible door, inaugurated at the main portal on 15 October 1950, contains 42 panels arranged in seven rows of six. Its programme combines inscriptions with reliefs illustrating the Ten Commandments, the Creed and the Lord’s Prayer.

== Gallery ==
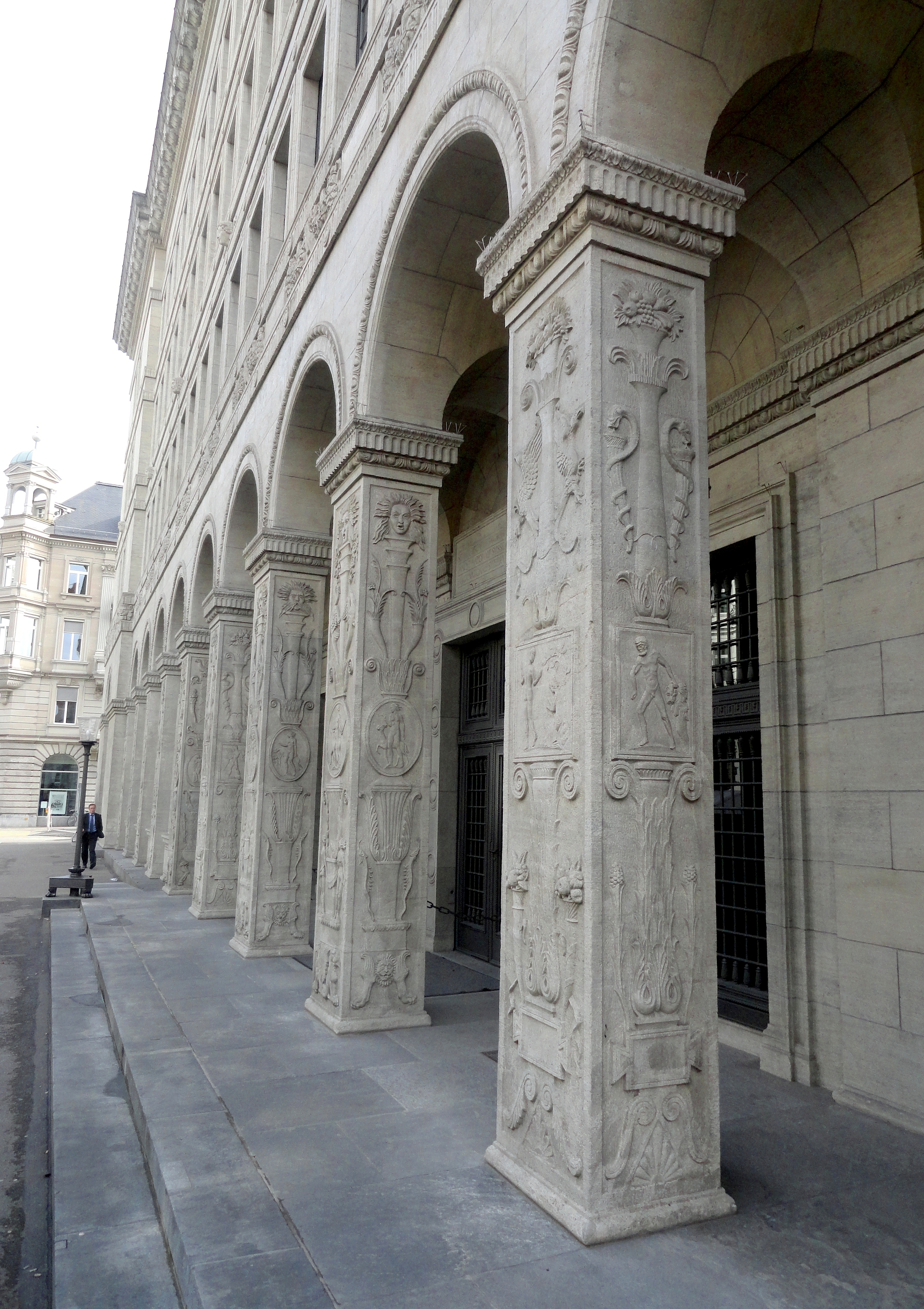
Columns at the Swiss National Bank in Zurich (1919–1922)

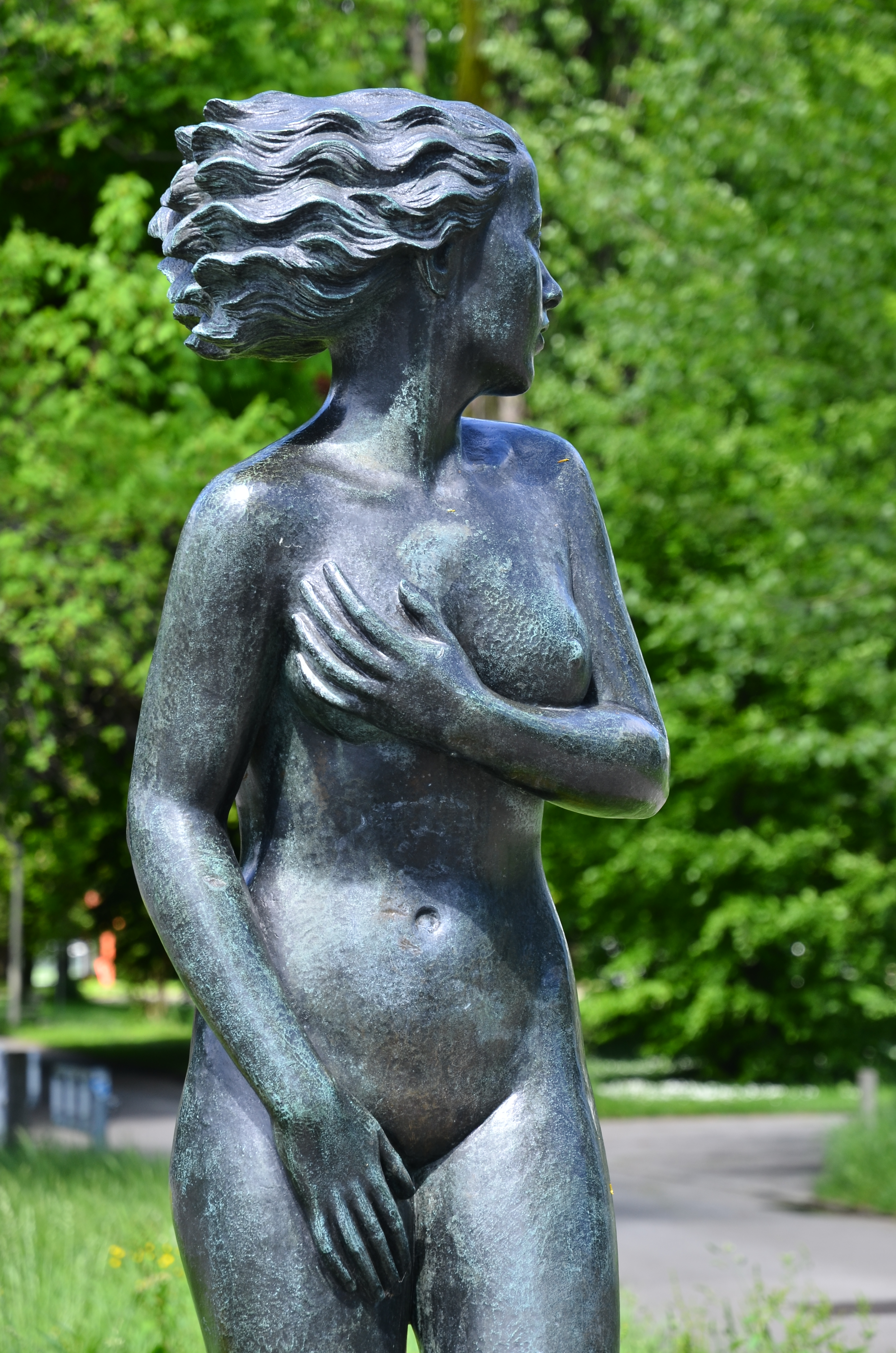
Mädchen im Wind at Mythenquai in Zurich (1936)

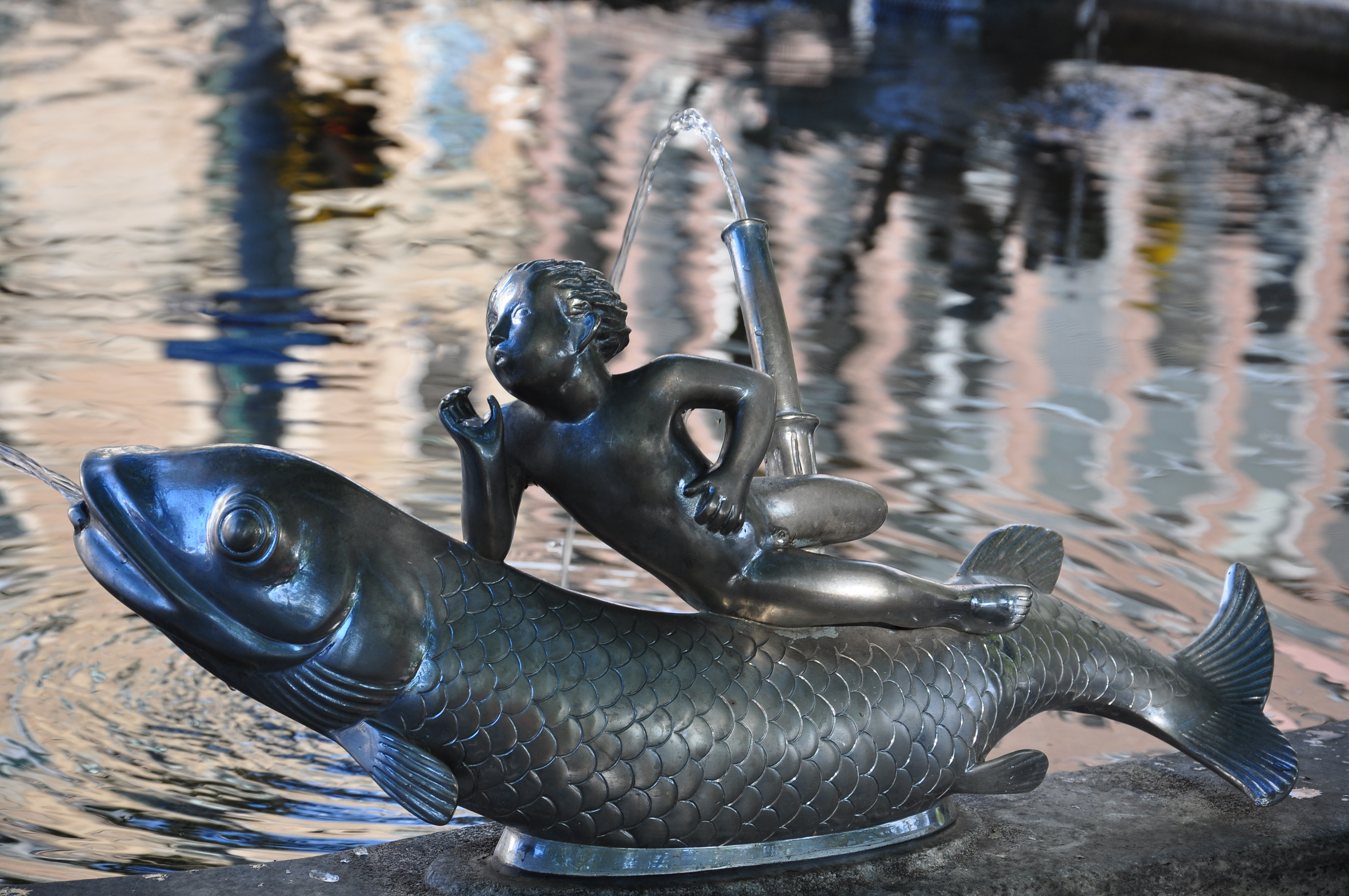
Boy seated on a fish, detail of the fountain at Bellevue in Zurich (1938)

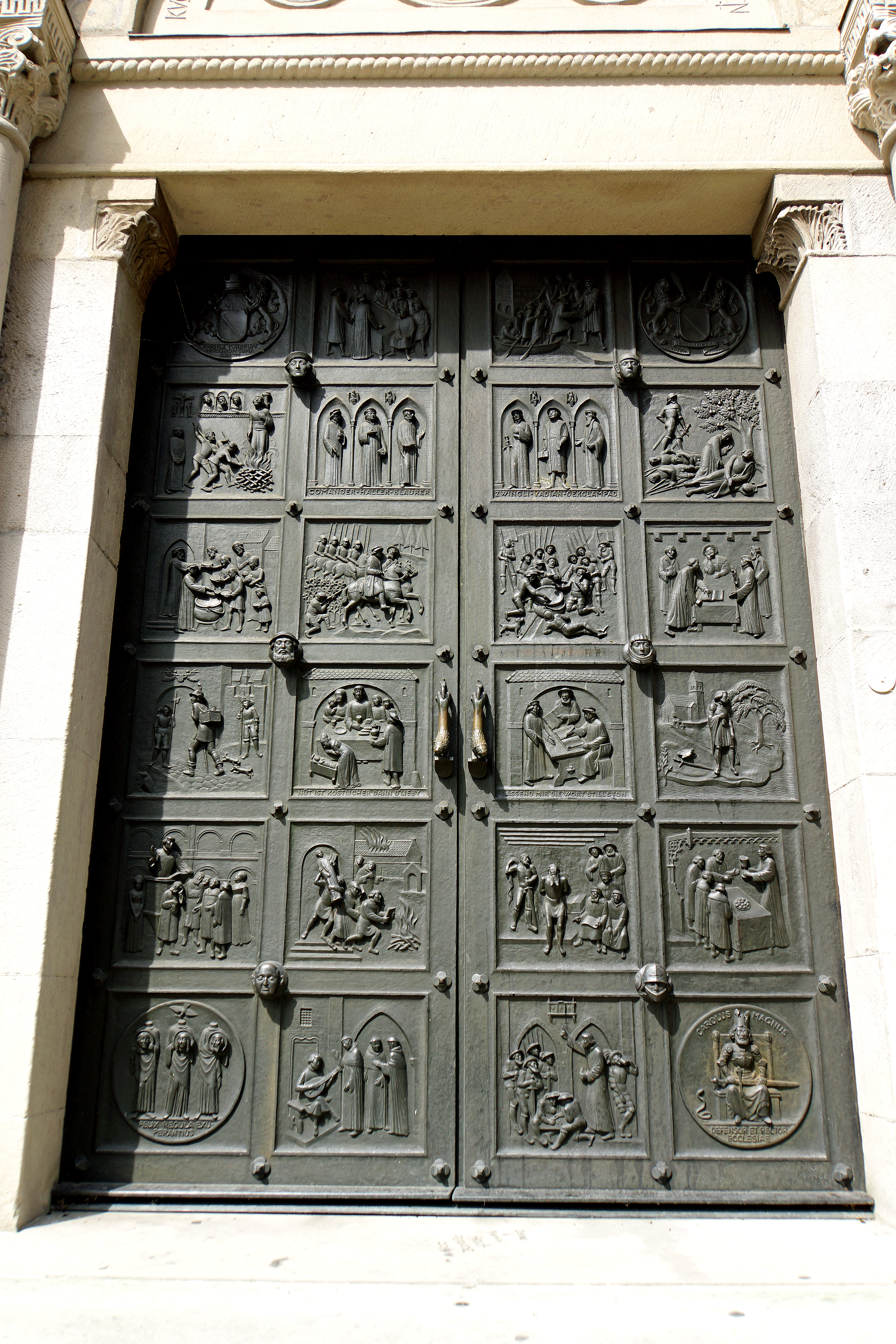
Zwingli door at the Grossmünster in Zurich (1935–1939)

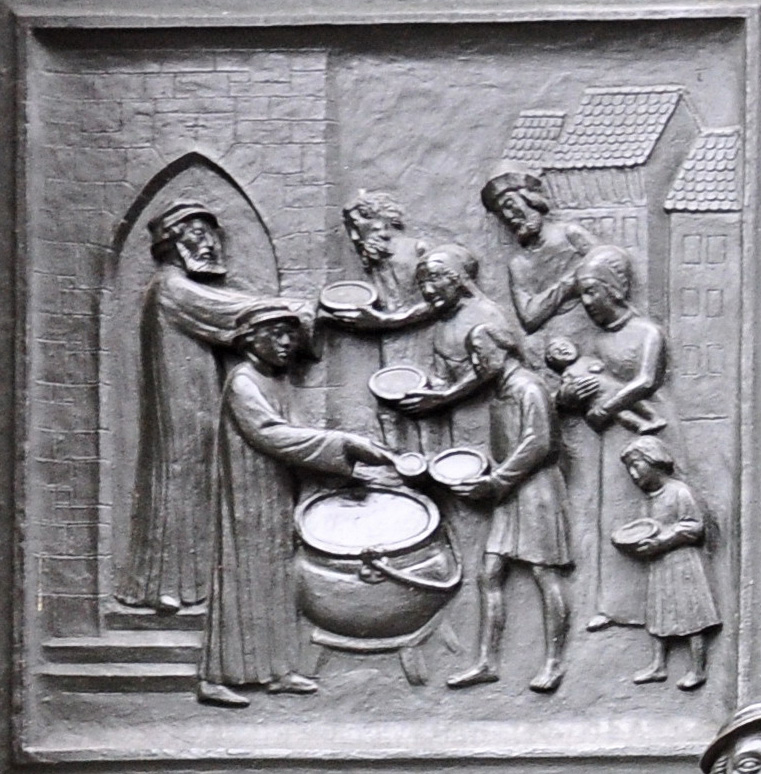
The soup kitchen, detail of the Zwingli door (1935–1939)

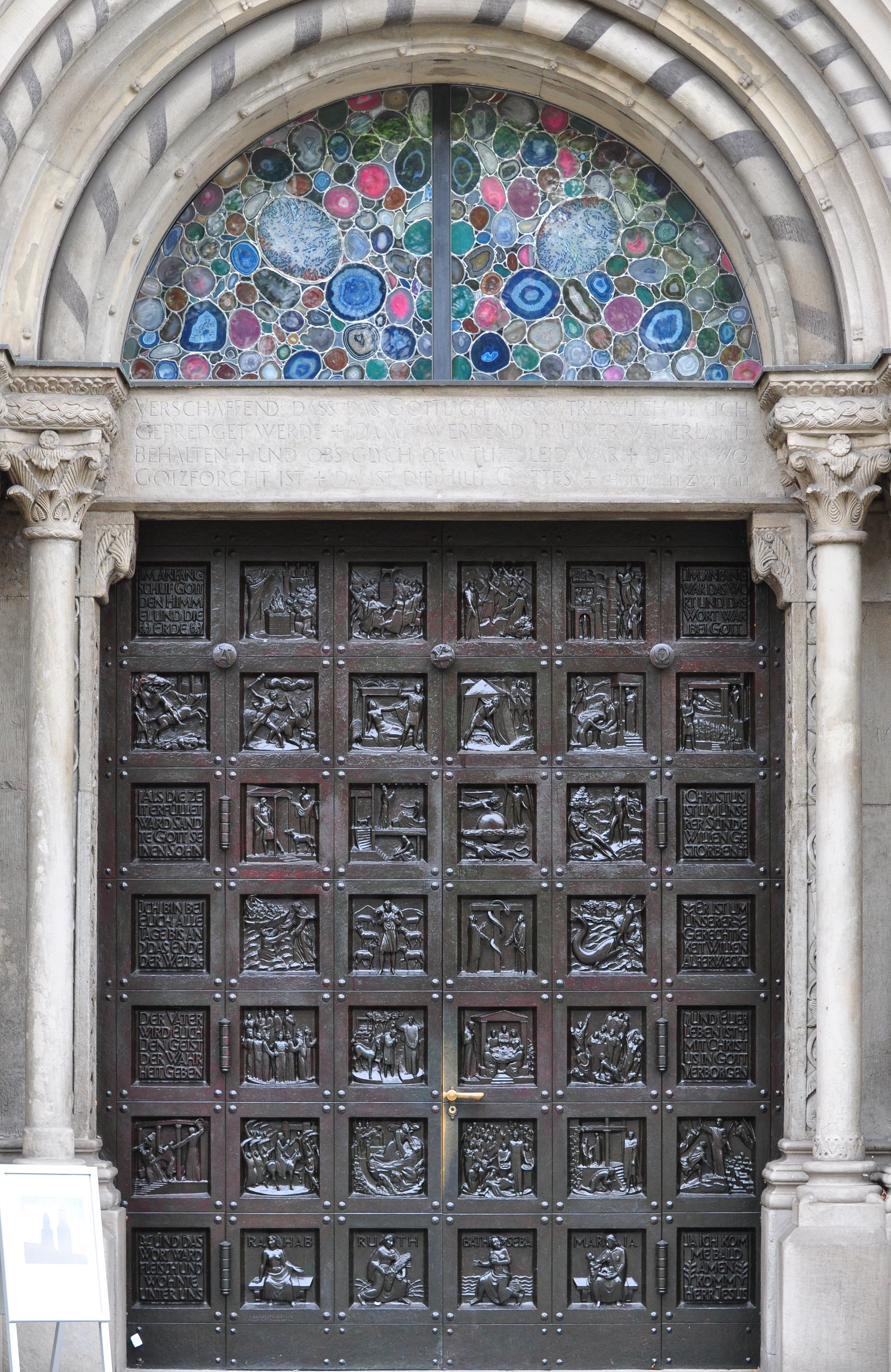
Bible door at the Grossmünster in Zurich (1944–1950)
