= Zentrum für Migrationskirchen =

Zentrum für Migrationskirchen (literally: Centre for migration churches) comprises eight Protestant churches from four continents, situated in the former church hall of the Evangelical Reformed Church of the Canton of Zürich in Zürich, being a unique centre in Switzerland for the so-called migration churches.

== Location ==
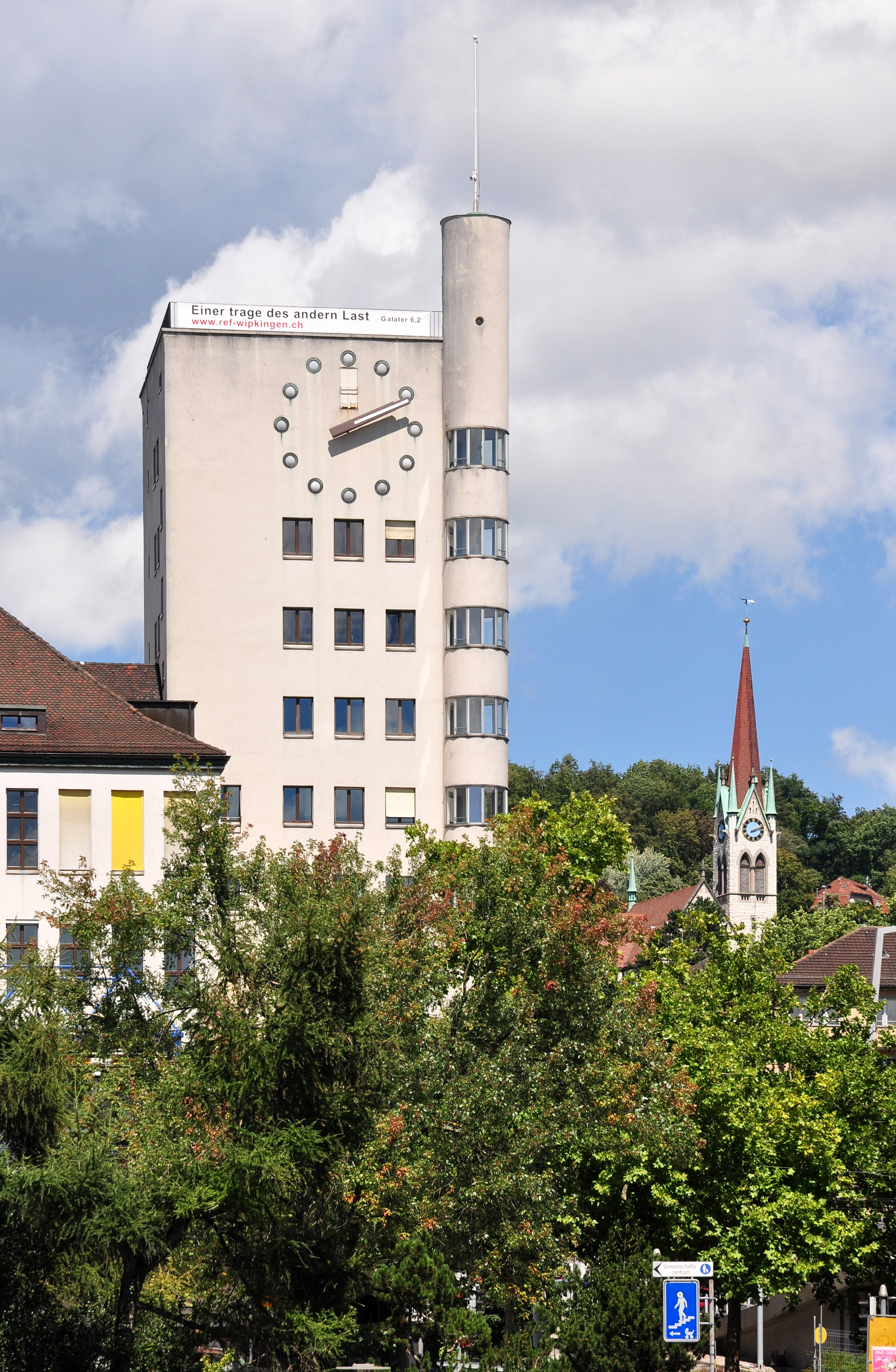
Kirchgemeindehaus Wipkingen

Located in the formerly independent municipality Wipkingen, the church hall (German: Kirchgemeindehaus) „Haus für das Volk“, meaning home for the people, was inaugurated in 1932, being the parish house of the Reformed church congregation, that is independent since 1865.

== History and background ==
About 60 religious associations have been established by or for immigrants in Zürich in the past 20 years. In order to offer appropriate denominational rooms, in 2008 the Evangelical Reformed Church of the Canton of Zürich respectively of the city of Zürich established the centre in Wipkingen. The theologian and pastor Dinah Hess is as of December 2014 its director, she tries also to find rooms for further parishes, and she is responsible for the rental of rooms and the communal life in the center. Pastor Hess also obliges the communication to the migration churches, and to aware that the Reformed Church sometimes may have a different understanding of mission between the registered partnership, and therefore not to deny, but to carefully address debates on such topics. On monthly meetings, all the church communities discuss organizational items, but also may discuss religious issues.

Currently there are eight churches from four continents, all of the Protestantism faith, situated in the centre. In addition to the Francophone community from the Republic of the Congo, there are also an Anglophone community of citizens from Nigeria, two Latin American churches for Spanish and Portuguese speaking people, a Tamil community, a Korean church, a Finnish church and a Swiss free church situated in the centre. As at many places in Switzerland, 'loud' worship often is not tolerated, and many communities have difficulty to find locations; therefore the centre promotes these charismatic churches, having in Switzerland usually called 'long', 'loud' and 'exotic' worship.

== Parishes in the centre ==
The Hansomang community comprises about 70 people from South Korea. Accompanied by piano, its white-robed choir sings during Sunday each louder than usual in Switzerland, otherwise the service is traditionally reformed, well-tempered and calm. Hansomang was founded in 2002, supported by the Presbyterian Church of Korea and the Presbyterian Church in Korea, and maintains a partnership with the Federation of Swiss Protestant Churches. The Korean community in Bern is connected to Hansomang as a sister church.

Eglise Evangélique missionaries International (EEM) is a free church from the Republic of the Congo, founded in 1992, and practicing a rollicking, rhythmic, unleashed Sunday service. Jeanette acts in worship as a presenter, accompanied by a six-member all-female band. The Francophone community is Protestant, but influenced by Evangelicals in the USA and by the Pentecostal free churches of South Africa. The church is decidedly missionary-oriented and distributes leaflets on the streets. It practices the "reverse mission" of migrant churches; the people that were converted to Christianity by European missionaries, bring the Gospel back to Europe.

The Oikos Church has its origins in Sri Lanka and was founded in 2004. The Protestant community supports people in Sri Lanka and India, which have suffered losses during the war and need help to survive. On Sunday morning about one hundred believers gather for two and a half hours of service. Children running around, the atmosphere is lively, the air stuffy, a youth worker participates also, and all is accompanied by keyboards and electric piano, praise, and believers witness their experience usually in the Tamil language. During the prayer all speak to himself. Most of the community members refuged to Switzerland in 1989, and about 30% of them gained the Swiss citizenship.

Igreja de Língua Portuguesa de Evangélica Zurique IELPZ was also founded in 1992 in Zürich. The members come from Latin America, Africa and Europe. The services are held in Portuguese and translated into German.

Suomalainen Seurakunta (Finnish parish) was founded in 2002, and compatriots in Zürich a piece of the Finnish church community.

The Divine Power Restoration Centre DPRC is a non-denominational church with members mainly from Nigeria that also gather on Sunday. It was founded in 2002, by 2010 it was called Word base Ministries Association.

Iglesia Vida Eterna offers Sunday worship services in Spanish and then the joint meetings with food from Latin America.

The International Church of Christ comprises international municipalities from different nations and was founded 20 years ago in Zürich. It is also celebrating on Sunday church services.

== Parish Wipkingen ==
Kirchgemeinde Wipkingen is the hostess of the center for migration churches, belonging to the Evangelical Reformed Church of the Canton of Zürich, in co-operaration with the parish Guthirt. The approximately 4,500 members inter alia call the members of the parish assembly, the community convention and pastors to share the leadership responsibilities.
