= District 10 (Zurich) =

Kreis 10 District of the city of Zurich
- District
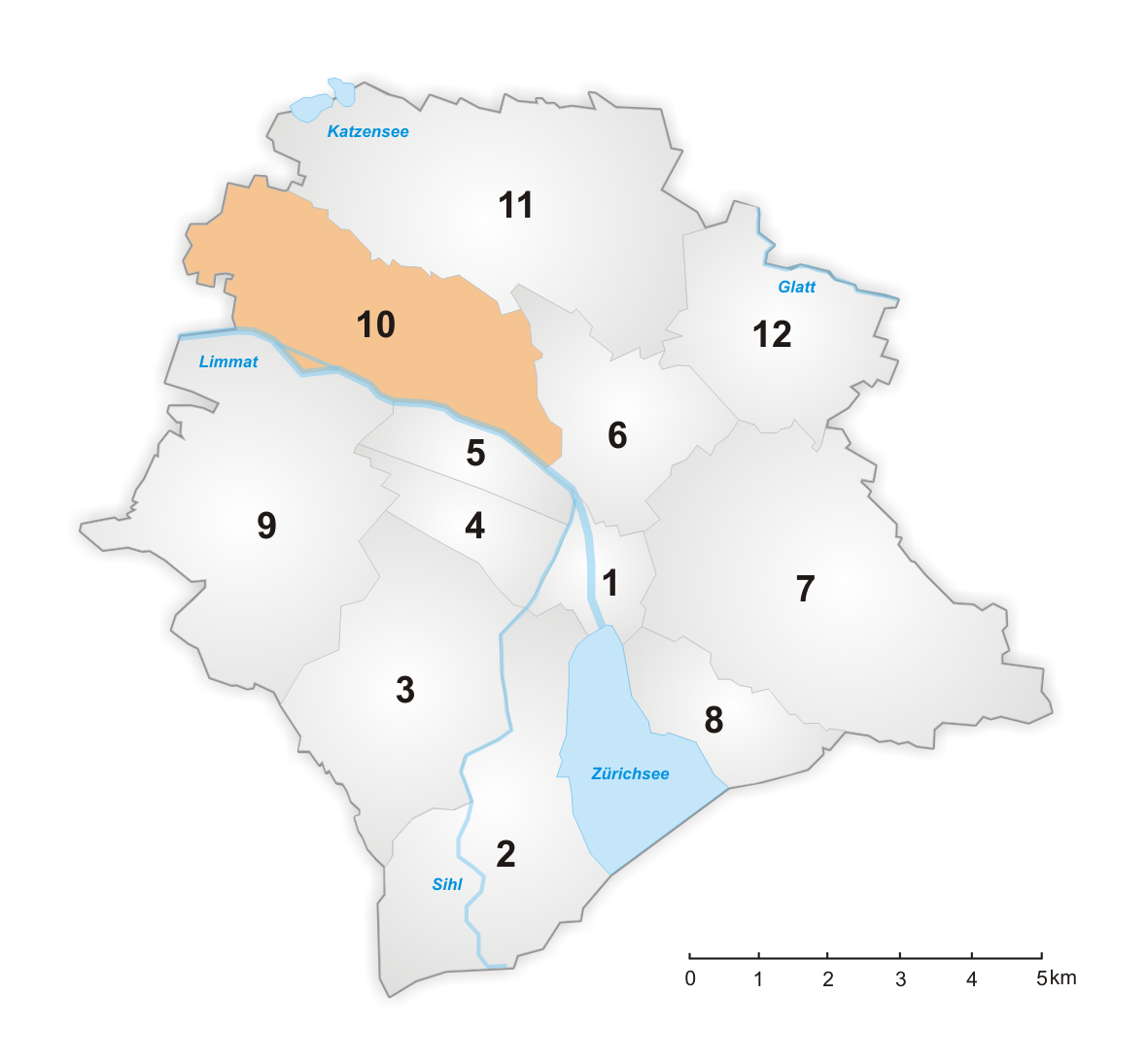
- Coordinates: 47.407°N 8.500°E
- Country: Switzerland
- Canton: Zurich
- City: Zurich

Area
  - Total: 9.09 km^{2} (3.51 sq mi)

Population (31. Dec. 2005)
  - Total: 36,219
  - Density: 3,984/km^{2} (10,320/sq mi)
- District Number: 10
- Quarters: Höngg; Wipkingen

District 10 is a district in the Swiss city of Zurich.

The district comprises the quarters Wipkingen and Höngg. Both entities were formerly municipalities of their own but were incorporated into Zurich in 1893 and 1934, respectively.
