= Evangelical Reformed Church of the Canton of Zürich =

The Evangelical-Reformed Church of the Canton of Zürich is a Reformed State Church in Zürich. In 2004, it had 533,000 members and 179 parishes with 900 house fellowships and 520 ordained clergy. The official language is German. It is a member of the Federation of Swiss Protestant Churches. The denomination has Presbyterian-Synodal church government. It is a member of the Conference of Churches on the Rhine. The church traces back its roots to 1519 when Ulrich Zwingli started the reformation in Zürich. Along with John Calvin's Geneva it became the headquarters of the Swiss Reformation.

Zentrum für Migrationskirchen (literally: Centre for migration churches) comprises eight Protestant churches from four continents, situated in the former church hall of the Reformed Church of the Canton of Zürich in Zürich-Wipkingen, being a unique centre in Switzerland for the so-called migration churches. Women's ordination is allowed in the Reformed Church of the Canton of Zürich. In August 2019, the Evangelical Reformed Church of the Canton of Zürich allowed blessings of same-sex marriages.
