= Rigiblick =

- Seilbahn Rigiblick, a funicular railway in Zürich-Oberstrass, Switzerland
- Theater Rigiblick, a theater in Zürich-Oberstrass
