= Zürichberg =

Wooded hill in Switzerland

Coordinates: 47°23′08″N 8°34′01″E

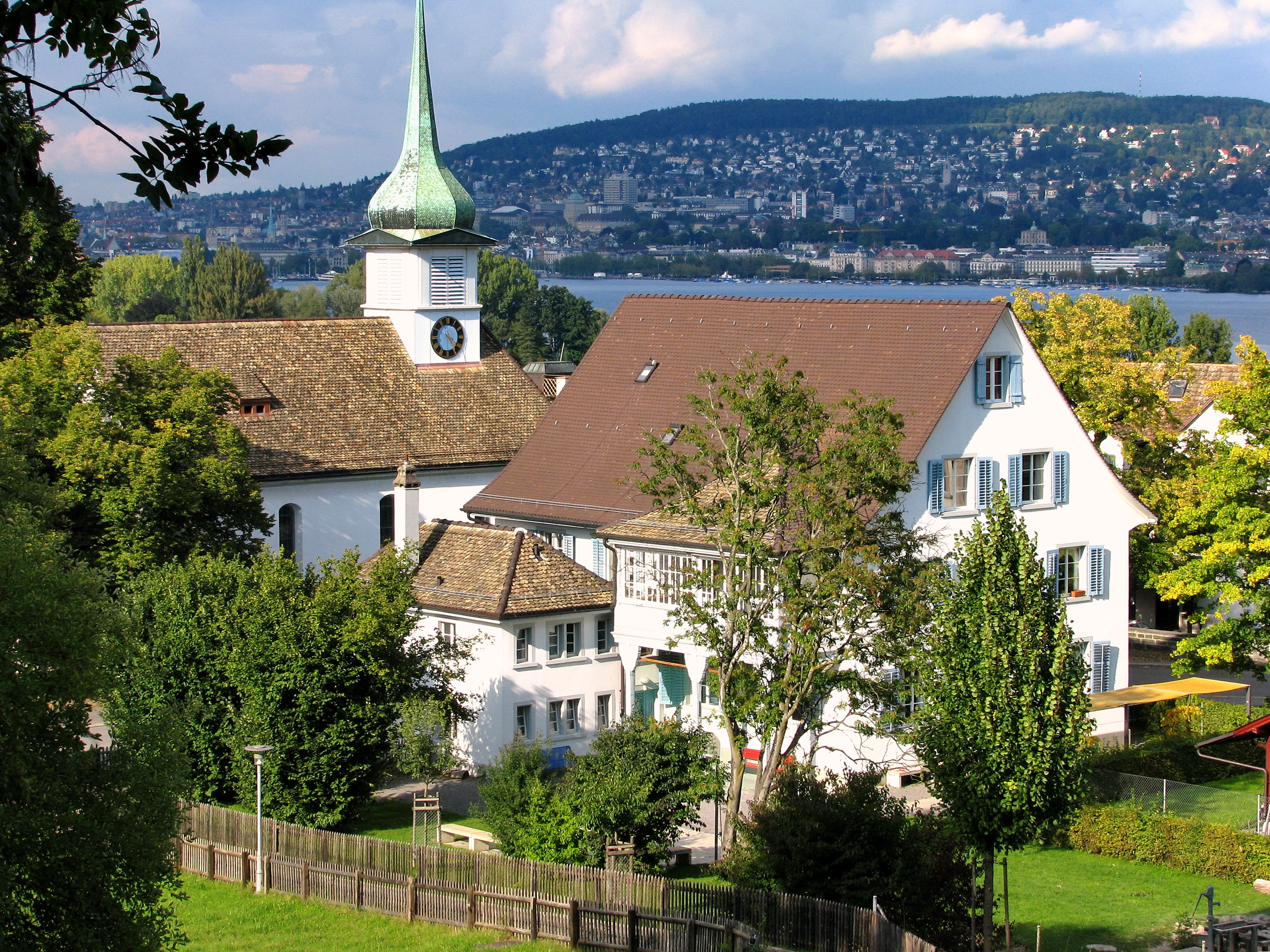
Zürichberg seen across Lake Zurich from Wollishofen (2008)

The Zürichberg is a wooded hill rising to 679 m (2,228 feet), overlooking Lake Zürich and located immediately to the east of the city of Zürich, Switzerland, between the valleys of the Limmat and the Glatt rivers. Its highest point is about 270 metres above the Limmat and it is part of a chain of hills, such as Käferberg, Adlisberg, Forch and Pfannenstiel, between the Greifensee/Glattal and Lake Zürich.

It is a picturesque location, and the lower western side of the hill is now part of the residential district of Zürich. The Zürich Zoo and FIFA's headquarters are located on the Zürichberg as well. There are grand mansions on the roads up the hill, and it is also the location of restaurants and hotels. The upper part of the hill is mostly woodland and a popular recreational area. Zürich tram route 6, the Rigiblick funicular and the Dolderbahn rack railway all run up to different parts of the hill. The Dolderbahn runs up to the Adlisberg, whilst the Zürichberg Tunnel carries trains of the Zürich S-Bahn underneath the hill.

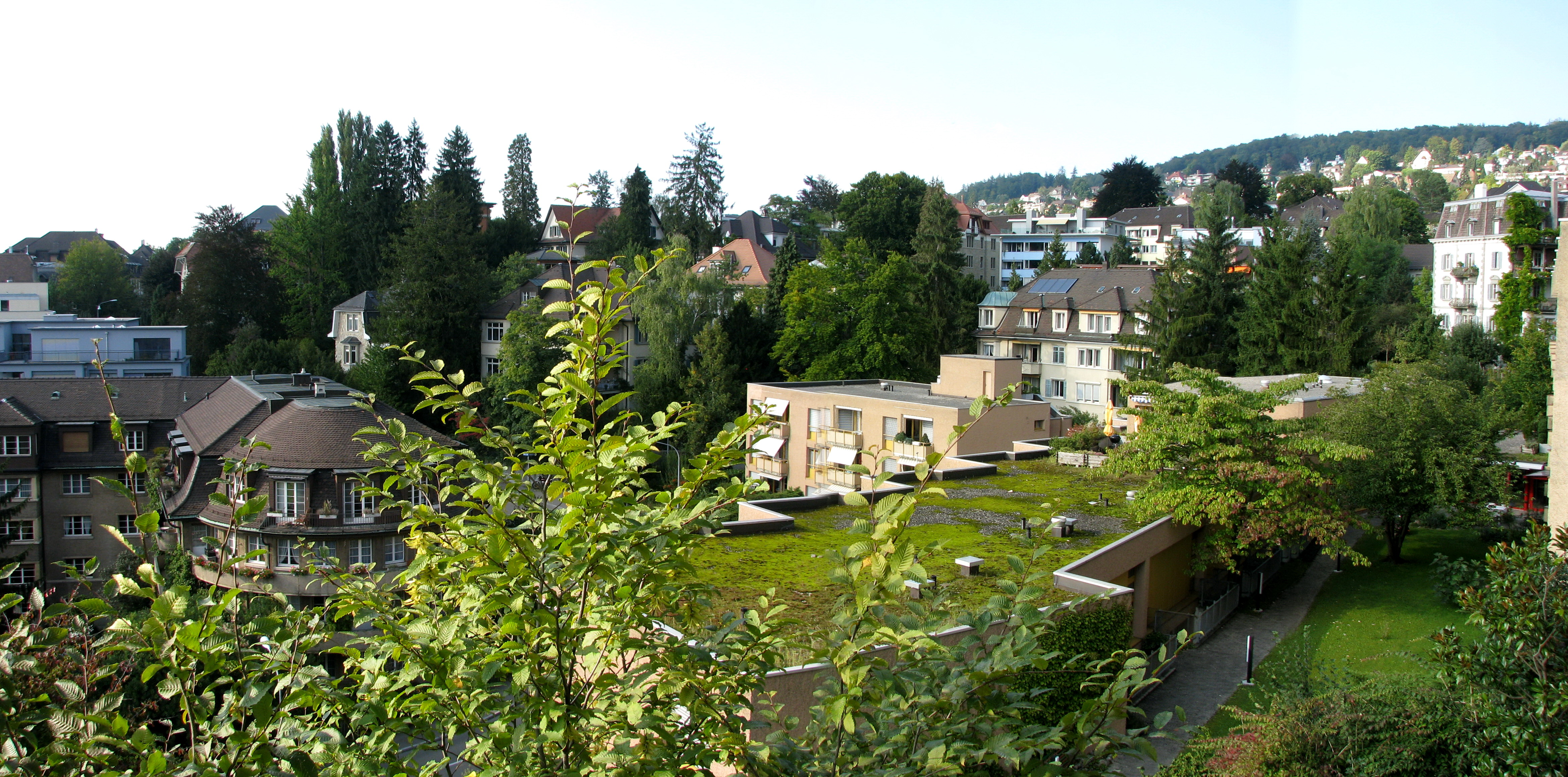
Zürichberg seen from Fluntern church (2008)

In 1962, the faculty of science of the University of Zürich proposed to establish the Irchelpark campus on the Strickhofareal. The first stage the construction of the university buildings was begun in 1973, and the campus was inaugurated in 1979. The construction of the second stage lasted from 1978 to 1983. The campus also houses the anthropological museum Anthropologisches Museum, and the cantonal Staatsarchiv Zürich. Built in 1901 as Rigiblick restaurant, the former Gastsaal was re-opened as Theater Rigiblick in 1984.
