= UZH Archives =

- 47°22′28″N 8°32′56″E
- Location: Rämistrasse 71, 8006 Zürich, Switzerland
- Type: University archive
- Established: 1998

Other information
- Website: www.archiv.uzh.ch

The UZH Archives is the central archive of the University of Zurich (UZH) and responsible for the acquisition, selection and processing of archival material produced by the organizational units of the University of Zurich. It also holds papers of individuals and societies connected to the UZH. Access to its holdings is provided in compliance with the archival law and the information and data protection law of the Canton of Zürich.

== History ==
The University Archives' first fonds was transferred from the repository of the president's office and goes back until 1833, when the University of Zurich was founded. In 1984 the Rectorate decided to establish a central archive and requested a position for an archivist. Until 1998, when the University of Zurich became an independent institution under public law, its holdings had regularly been transferred to the State Archives of the Canton of Zürich.

The collection of the Documentation Centre for University History was acquired by the UZH Archives after its dissolution in 1998. It was founded by a group of legal and humanities scholars in 1972 in order to collect historically relevant material, especially personal papers of UZH scholars, that could be used for the university's 150th anniversary in 1983.

== Holdings ==
The holdings of the UZH Archives are divided into five sections. The first section holds the historical archives, consisting of minutes of the departments, habilitation theses, diploma duplicates and personal files of the lecturers. The second section − the "new" archives based on provenance − contains minutes of the University Directorate and Senate as well as various fonds of the Rectorate, the Dean's Offices, Central Services and Departments or Institutes.

The third section includes the private archives, which are either scientific papers of UZH scholars or archives of UZH-related associations. The fourth section comprises documentations or collections assembled by the UZH Archives, for example a photo collection of portraits of former rectors and lecturers or a documentation about the main building of the university. The fifth and last section contains a collection of prints and brochures that were published by the University of Zurich. The UZH website has been digitally archived as part of this collection since 2012.

== Editions and services ==
- Online archives catalog
- Online historical lecture directory HistVV 1833−1900
- Online historical student registration database 1833−1924
