= Susanna Orelli-Rinderknecht =

Swiss activist (1845–1939)

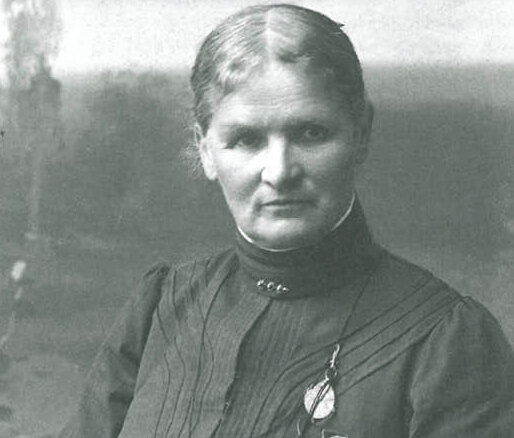
- Born: 27 December 1845; Oberstrass, Zurich, Switzerland
- Died: 12 January 1939 (aged 93)
- Organization(s): Blue Cross; Zurich Women's Association for Temperance and Public Welfare
- Spouse: Johannes Orelli (m. 1881, d. 1885)

Susanna Orelli-Rinderknecht (née Rinderknecht, 27 December 1845 – 12 January 1939) was a Swiss activist. She was the founder of the Zurich Women's Association for Temperance and Public Welfare in 1894.

== Biography ==
Orelli-Rinderknecht was born on 27 December 1845 in Oberstrass, Zurich, Switzerland to a wealthy farming family. Her parents were Heinrich Rinderknecht, a farmer and mayor of Zurich, and Susanna Rinderknecht (née Stadelmann). She studied home economics.

Orelli-Rinderknecht married the mathematics professor Johannes Orelli in 1881. She was widowed in 1885.

After her husband's death, Orelli-Rinderknecht joined the Blue Cross animal welfare charity and participated in poor relief.

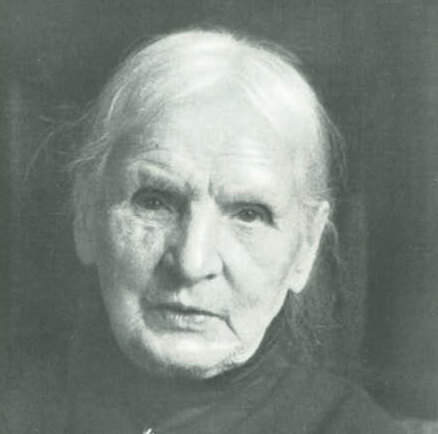
Orelli-Rinderknecht in later life

In 1894, Orelli-Rinderknecht was the founder of the Zurich Women's Association for Temperance and Public Welfare (now German: ZFV-Unternehmungen) with 15 other middle-class women, which aimed to combat alcoholism. She was not elected to the board. Two years later she became chairwoman of the newly created works commission of the association. She served in this post until 1919.

Orelli-Rinderknecht was awarded a doctor honoris causa from the Medical Faculty of the University of Zurich (UZH, German: Universität Zürich) in "recognition of her contributions to public health and economics."

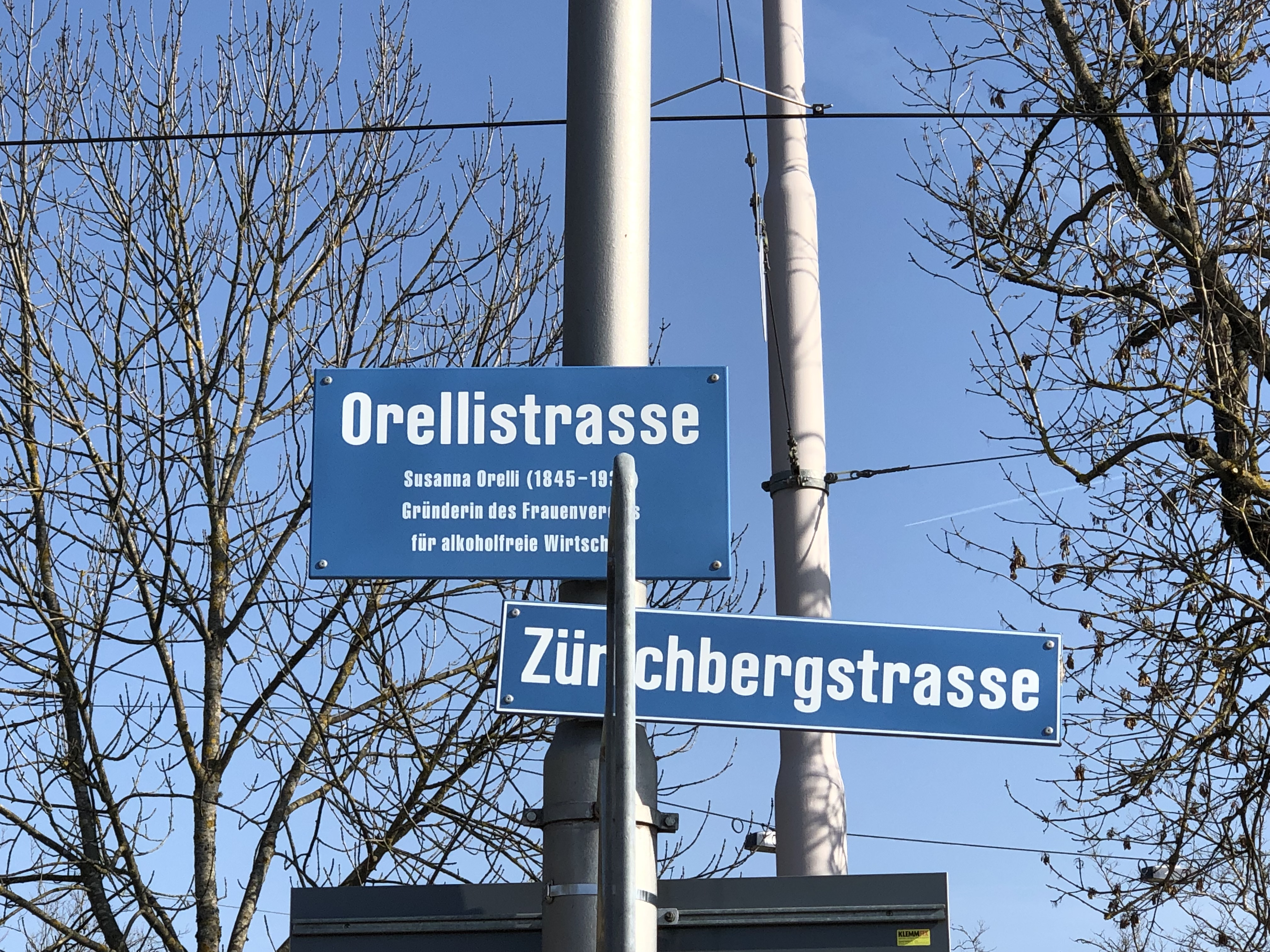
Orellistrasse

== Death and commemoration ==
Orelli-Rinderknecht died on 12 January 1939 in Zurich, Switzerland, aged 93.

From 1945, Orelli-Rinderknecht was the first woman to appear on a Swiss postage stamp. A street in Zurich, Orellistrasse, was named in her honour.
