= Unterstrass =

Quarter in the district 6 in Zürich

- Quarter
- Aerial view by Walter Mittelholzer (1933)

- Flag Coat of arms

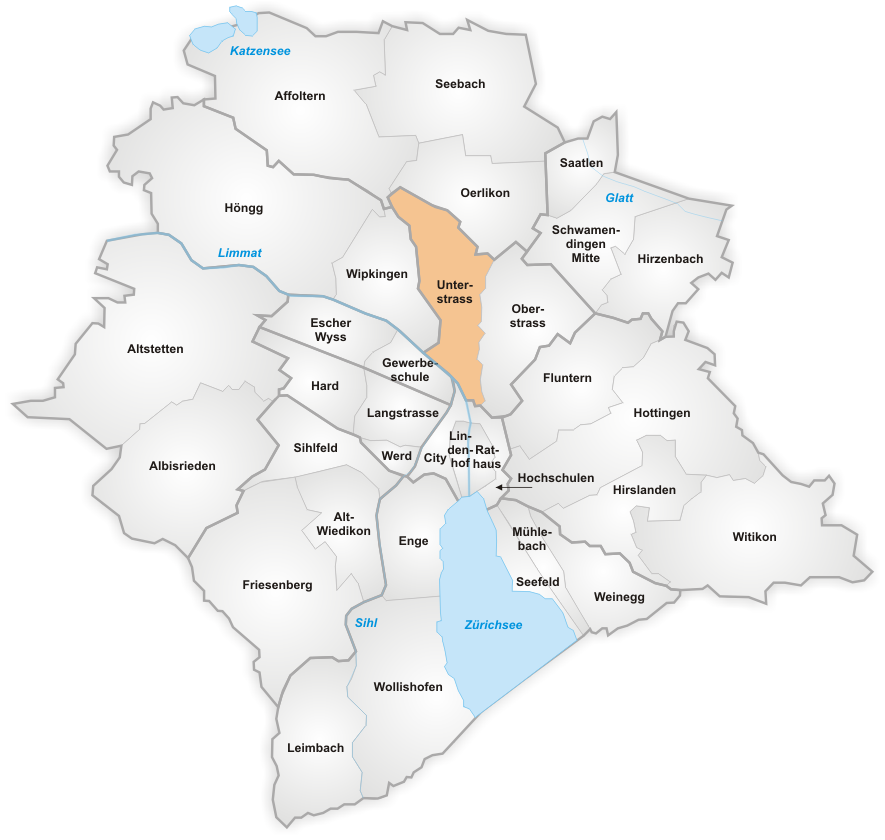
- The quarter of Unterstrass in Zurich
- Coordinates: 47°23′32″N 8°32′22″E
- Country: Switzerland
- Canton: Zurich
- City: Zurich
- District: 6

Unterstrass is a quarter in the district 6 in Zurich.

It was formerly a municipality of its own, having been incorporated into Zurich in 1893.

As of 2025, the quarter has a population of 25,078, in an area of 2.47 km^{2} (0.95 sq mi).

In 1962, the faculty of science of the University of Zurich proposed to establish the Irchelpark campus on the Strickhofareal. The first stage the construction of the university buildings was begun in 1973, and the campus was inaugurated in 1979. The construction of the second stage lasted from 1978 to 1983. The campus previously also housed the anthropological museum (Anthropologisches Museum), which merged with other museums into the Natural History Museum of the University of Zurich in 2024, and the cantonal Staatsarchiv Zürich. Built in 1901 as Rigiblick restaurant, the former Gastsaal was re-opened as Theater Rigiblick in 1984.

== Gallery ==
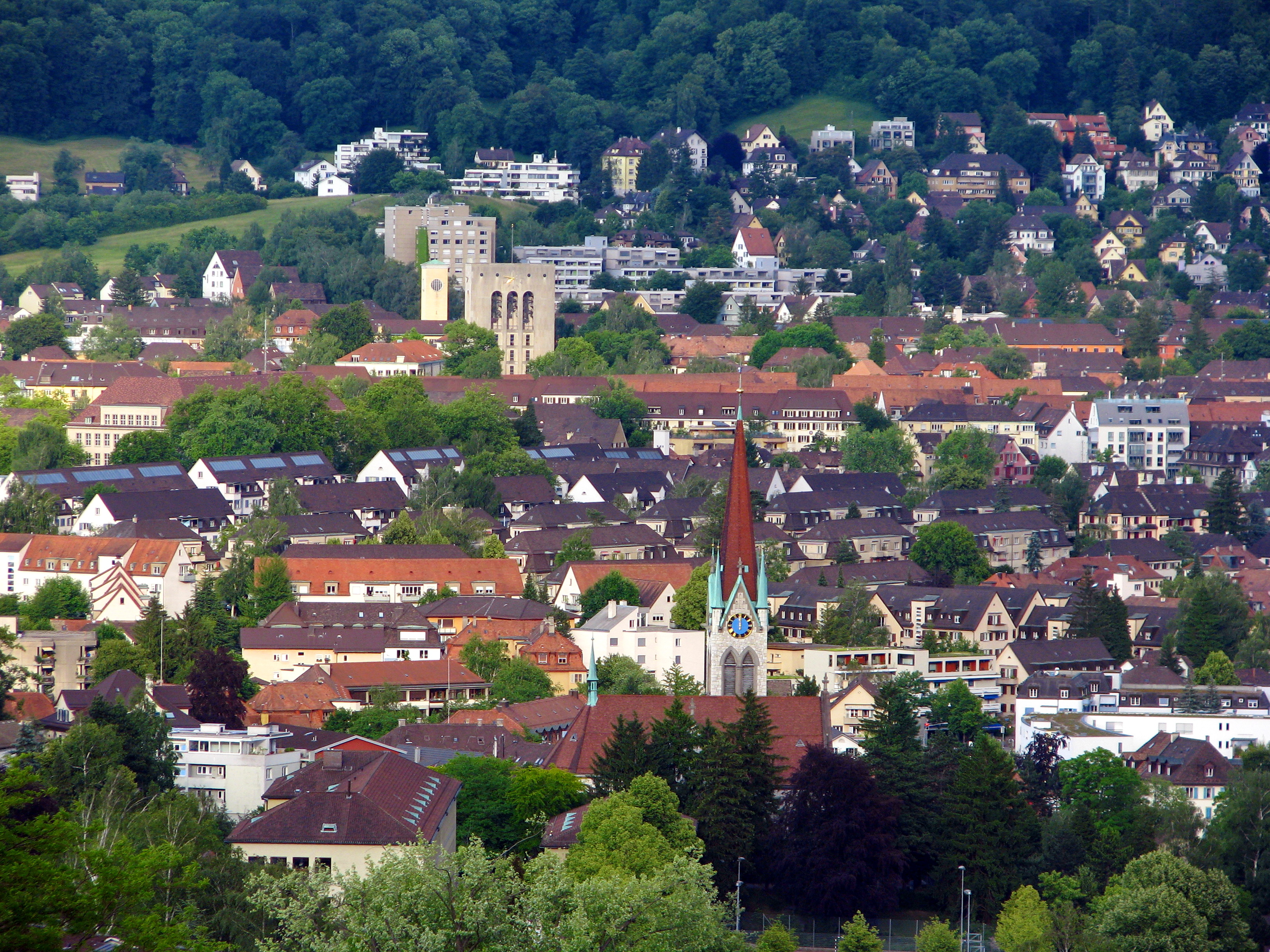
Wipkingen (foreground) and Unterstrass seen from Käferberg

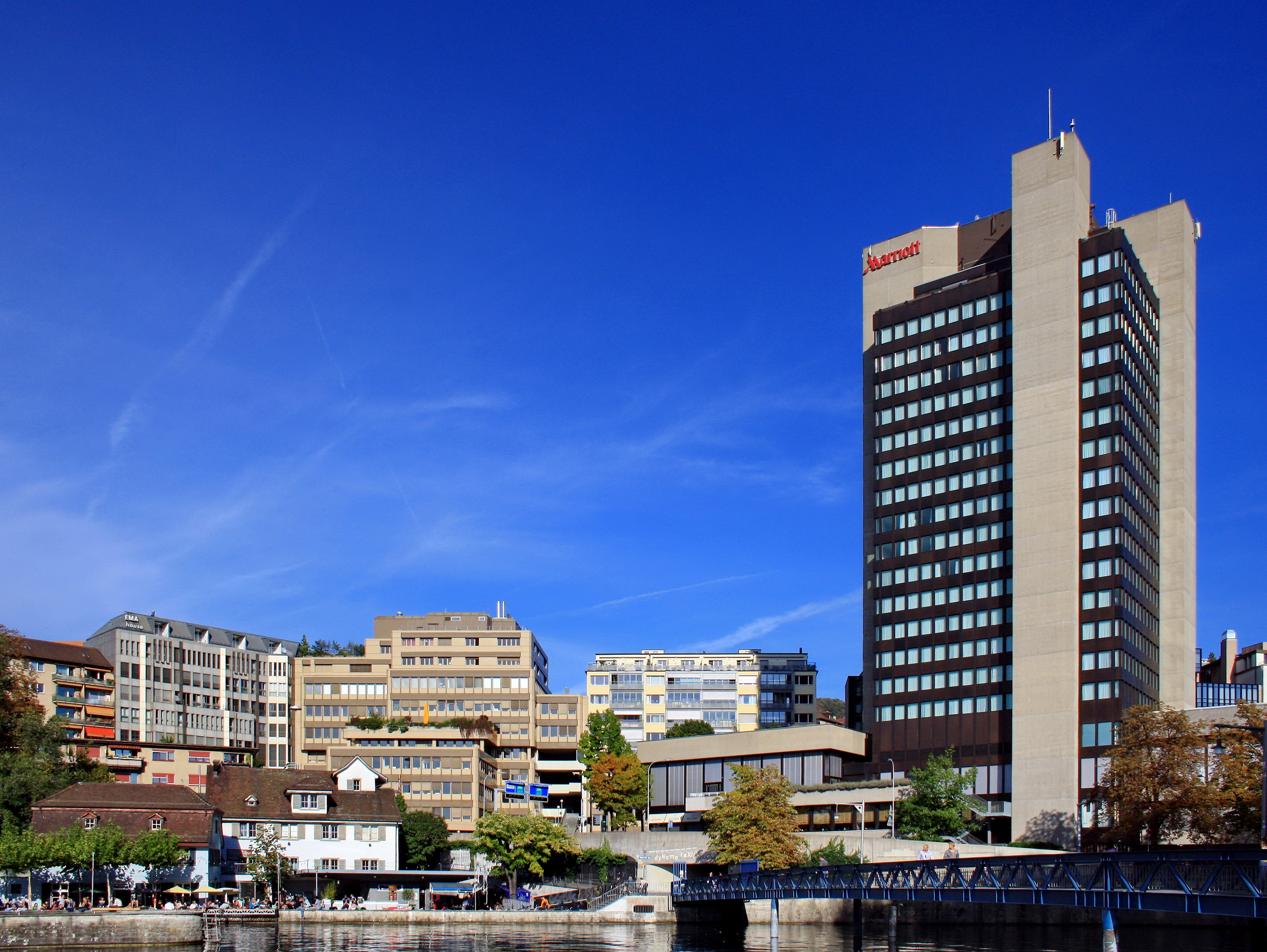
Unterstrass seen from James Joyce plateau

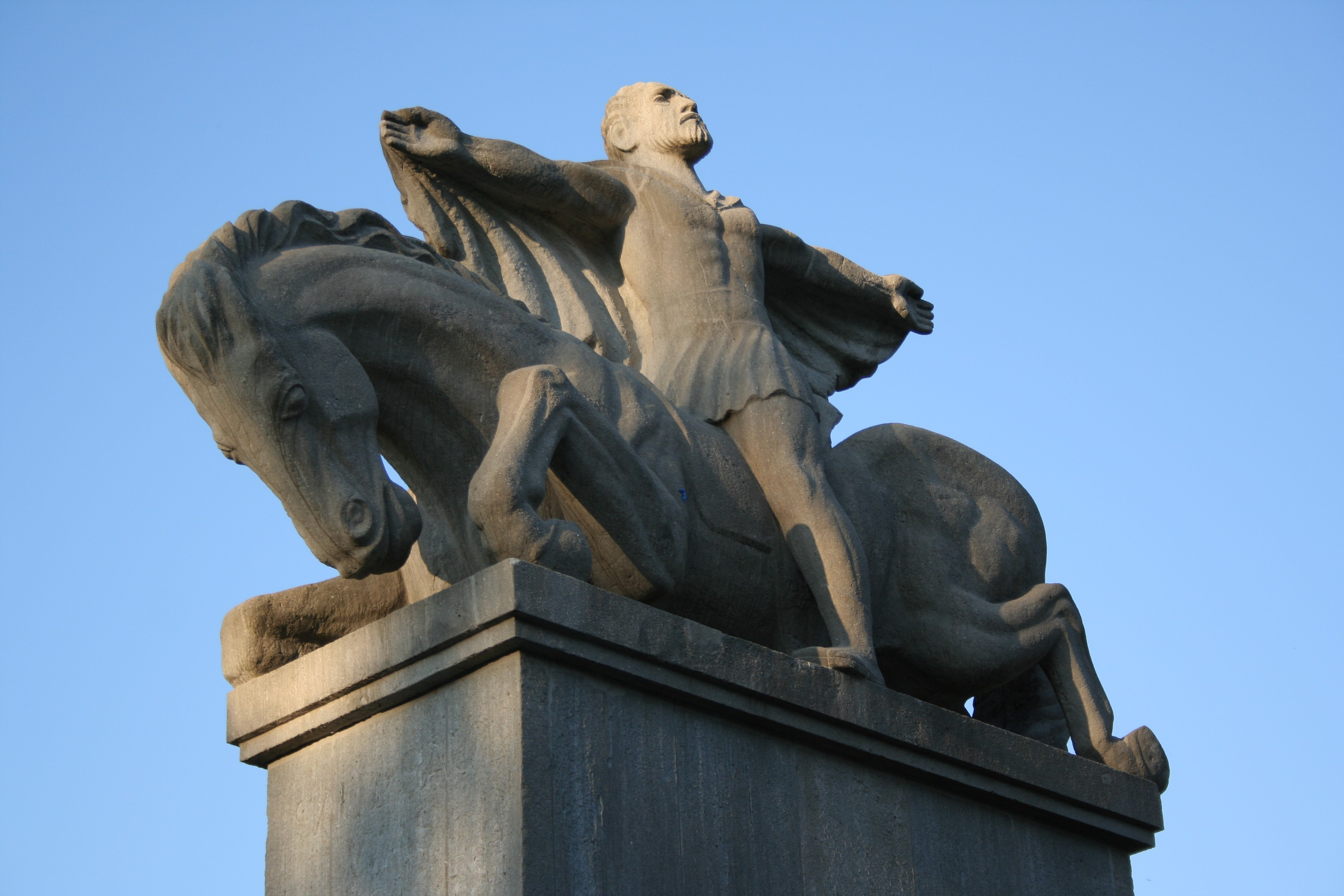
"Die Bekehrung des Apostels Paulus", Paulus church
