= Oberstrass =

Quarter of the city of Zurich, Switzerland

- Quarter
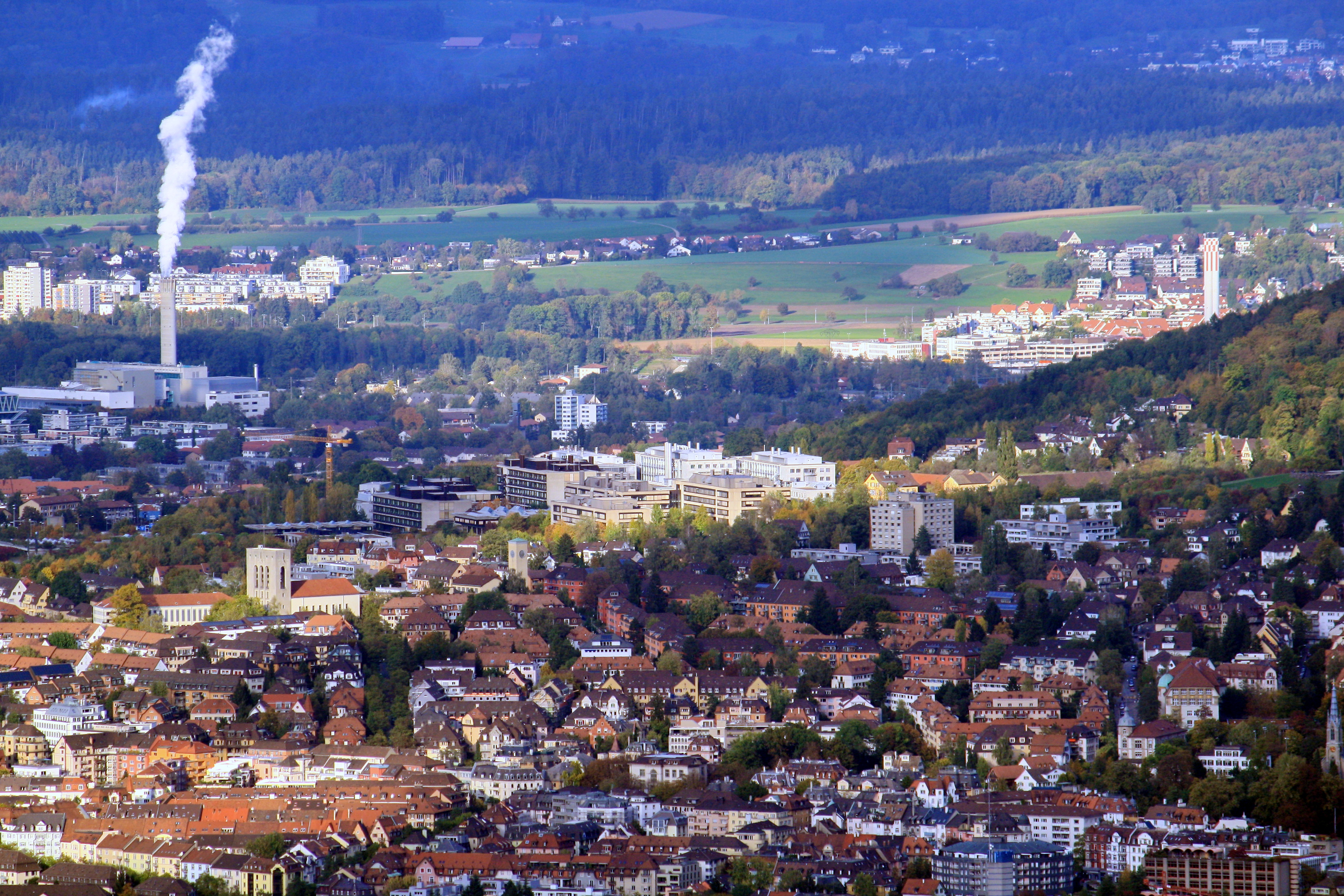
- Oberstrass and Irchelpark as seen from Uetliberg, Oerlikon (to the left) and Seebach in the background (October 2009)

- Flag Coat of arms

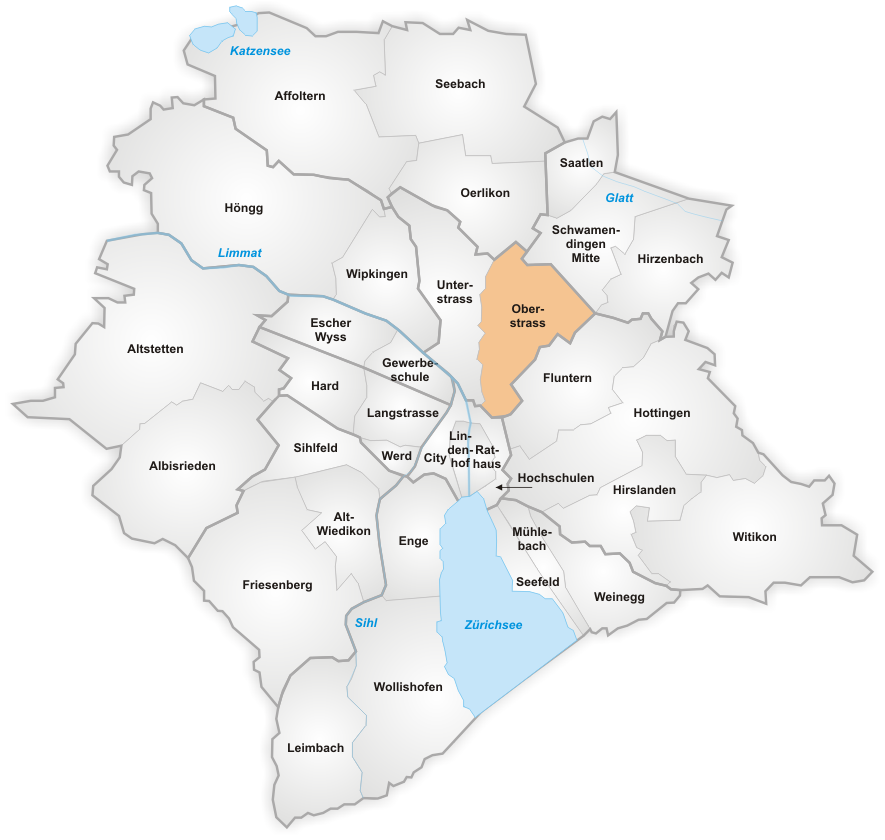
- The quarter of Oberstrass in Zurich
- Coordinates: 47°23′08″N 8°32′58″E
- Country: Switzerland
- Canton: Zurich
- City: Zurich
- District: 6

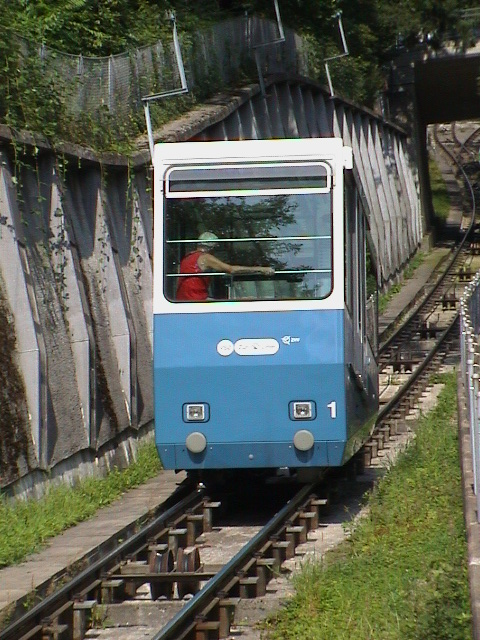
Funicular Rigiblick

Oberstrass is a quarter in the district 6 in Zurich.

It was formerly a municipality of its own, having been incorporated into Zurich in 1893. As of 2025, the quarter has a population of 11,083 distributed on an area of 2.64 km^{2} (1.02 sq mi).

The Rigiblick funicular can be found in Oberstrass as one of two funiculars within the city of Zurich.

Built in 1901 as Rigiblick restaurant, the former Gastsaal was re-opened as Theater Rigiblick in 1984.

== Gallery ==
Aerial view by Walter Mittelholzer (1933)
