= Irchelpark =

Park in Zurich, Switzerland

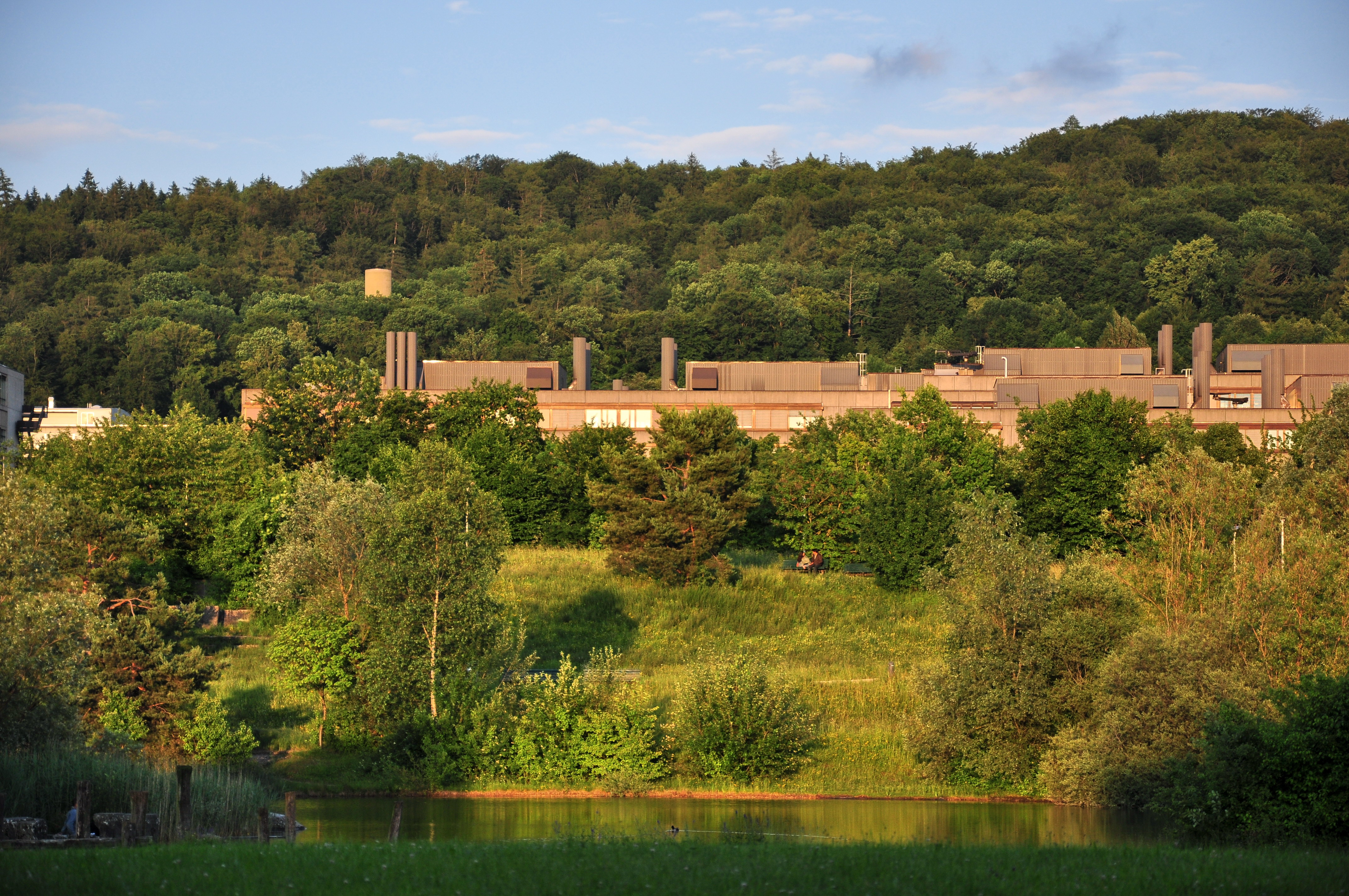
- Irchelpark and campus
- Interactive map of Irchelpark
- Type: Urban park, University campus
- Location: Oberstrass and Unterstrass in Zurich, Switzerland
- Coordinates: 47°23′54.13″N 8°32′38.07″E
- Area: 32 hectares (79 acres)
- Created: 1979–1986
- Owner: Canton of Zurich
- Operator: Grün Stadt Zürich
- Status: Open all year

Irchelpark is the biggest public park in the city of Zurich, Switzerland and home to the Irchel campus of the University of Zurich and Staatsarchiv Zürich. Like the university itself, Irchelpark is owned by the Canton of Zurich, but is maintained by the city on the canton's behalf.

== Location ==
Irchelpark is situated mainly in the Unterstrass district of the city. Public transport is provided by tram lines 9 and 10 at the Universität Irchel stop as well as tram lines 7, 9, 10 and 14, and VBZ bus lines 39, 69, 72 and 83 at the adjacent Milchbuck hub.

The park is divided underground by Winterthurerstrasse and one of the feeders of the A1 motorway, bridged by a wide natural stone stairway. The upper part houses the university campus, as well as underground sports, former military (Zivilschutz) and parking facilities, and the buildings of the Staatsarchiv Zürich.

== History ==
In 1962, the faculty of science of the University of Zurich proposed to several university institutes, to improve the utilization of synergies and cost savings in a campus on the Strickhofareal farm situated at the western slope of the Zürichberg hill. The first stage of the construction works of the university buildings began in 1973, and the campus was inaugurated in 1979. The construction of the second stage lasted from 1978 to 1983. Among other things, the excavated material of the first and second stage was a problem that was not solved, thus the terrain in the Unterstrass and Oberstrass district was used for landfills. On the basis of the adjusted goals, a competition for the design of a park was started in 1979.

A further extension of the Staatsarchiv building was approved by the parliament of the Canton of Zurich in March 2016 for the construction of Bau 3 (stage 3) for 25 million Swiss Francs; adjacent to the present building (stage 2), a cafeteria and conference rooms will be built, including a solar power plant.

Because the capacities of the Irchel campus of the University of Zurich also are exhausted, an extension was started in mid-April 2016. "Phase 5" comprises three further campus buildings of 14,000 square metres (150,695 sq ft) for 195 million Swiss Francs. The primary tenant, the Department of Chemistry, began taking possession in July 2021.

== Geography and structure ==
As a first step in the lower part of the park was created with the artificial lake that is a separated by a wooden construction serving as pathway and a wide bridge crossing the water. The upper part houses the central axis of the campus towards Frohburgstrasse, where among others a restaurant, a wide meadow, and a scenic outpost overlooking the Limmat Valley are located. The then-new type of integration of gaming activities, a jogging facility, natural playgrounds and fireplaces in the natural areas of the park harbored a certain risk but were solved within the 1990s.

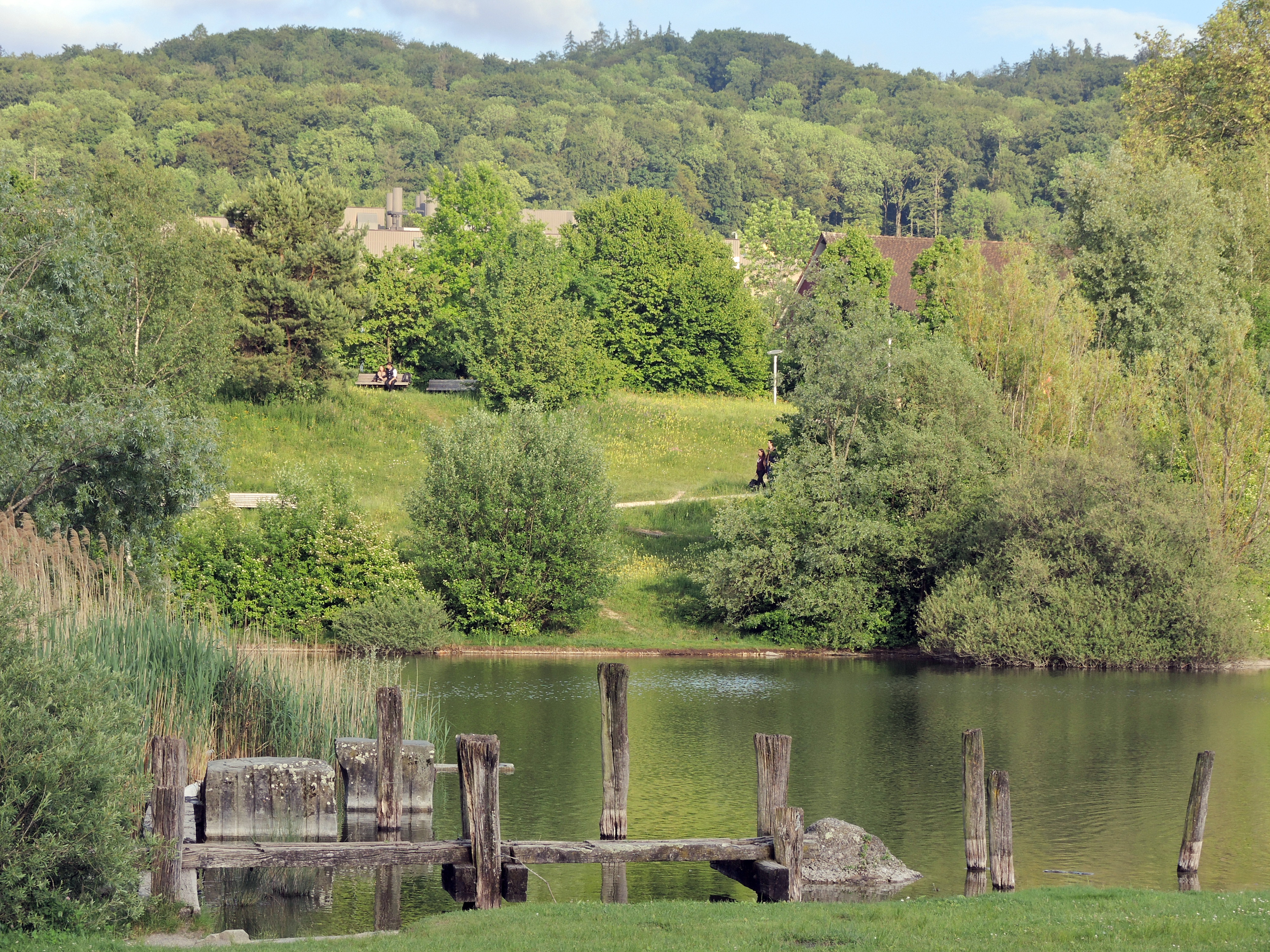
Flora and fauna nearby the granite bridge–stairs

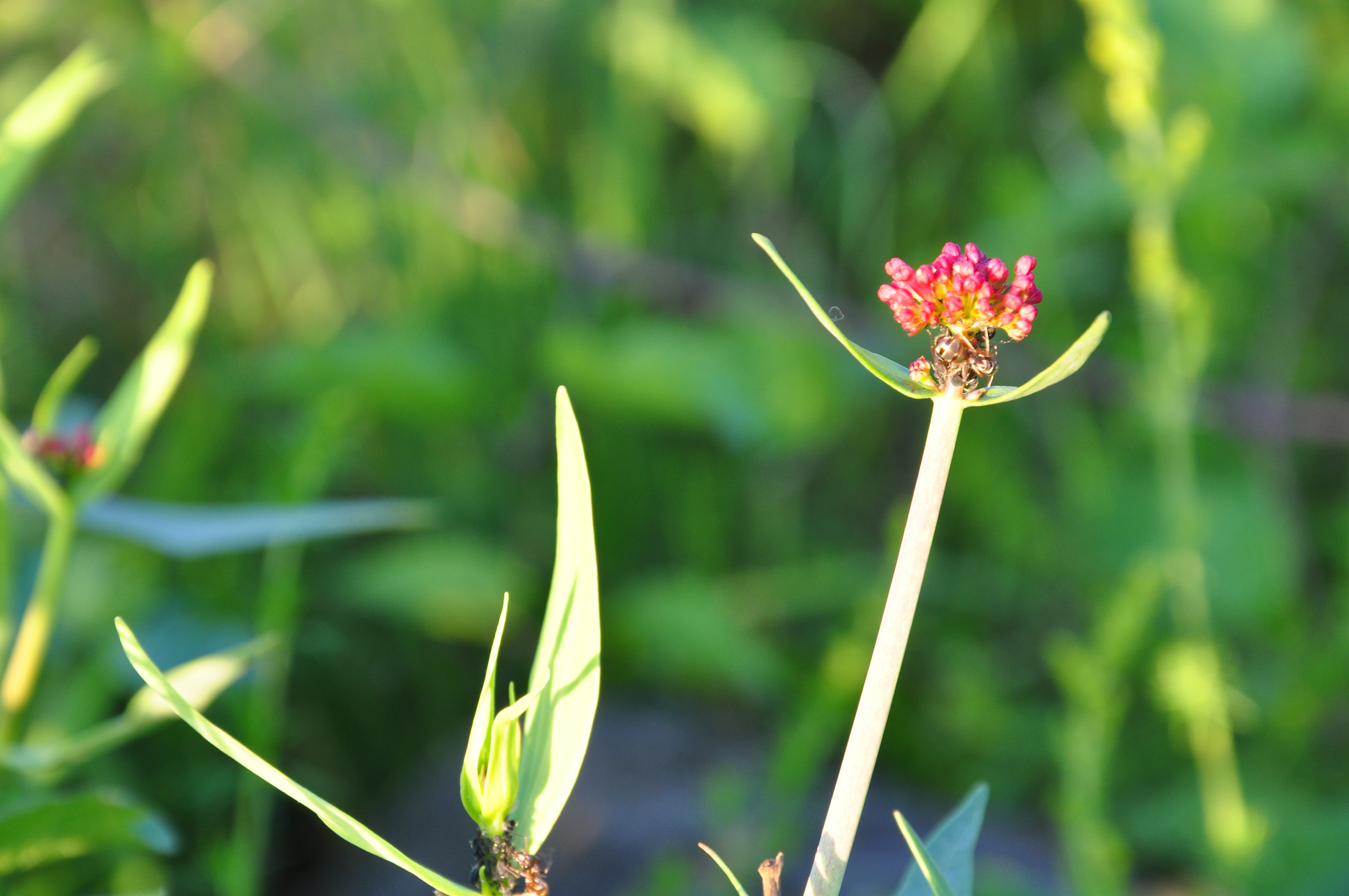

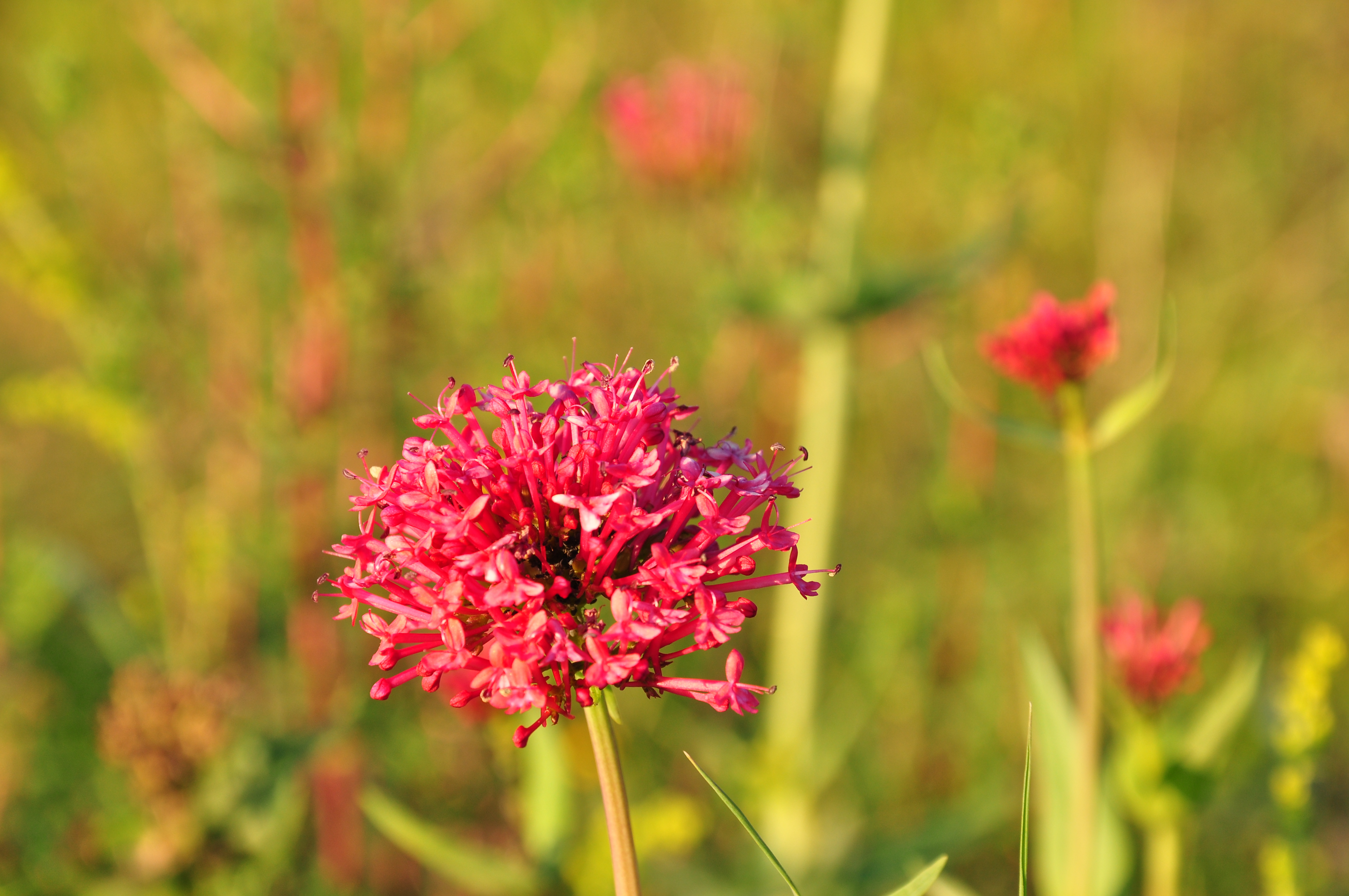

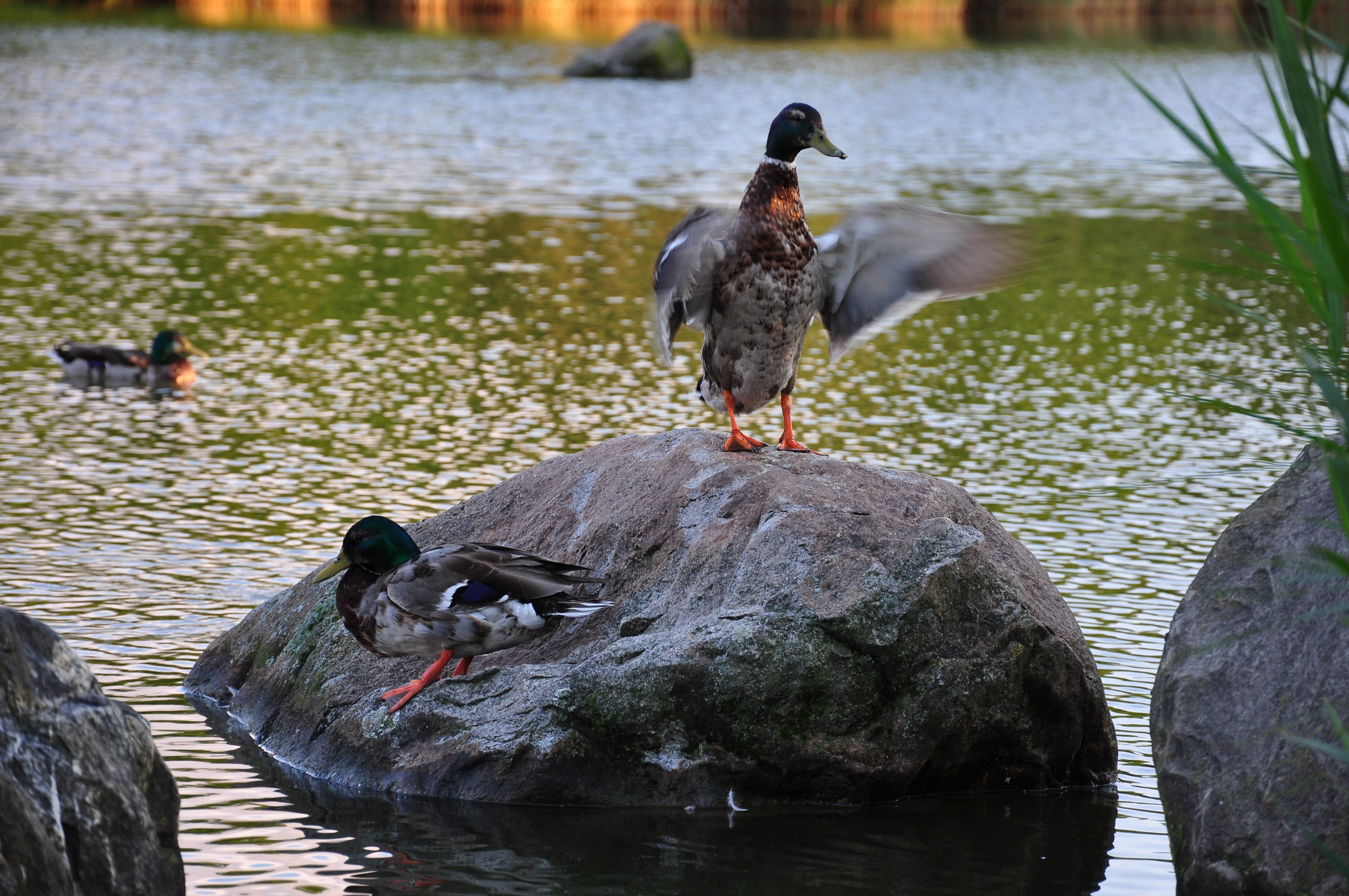
Anas platyrhynchos resting at the lake

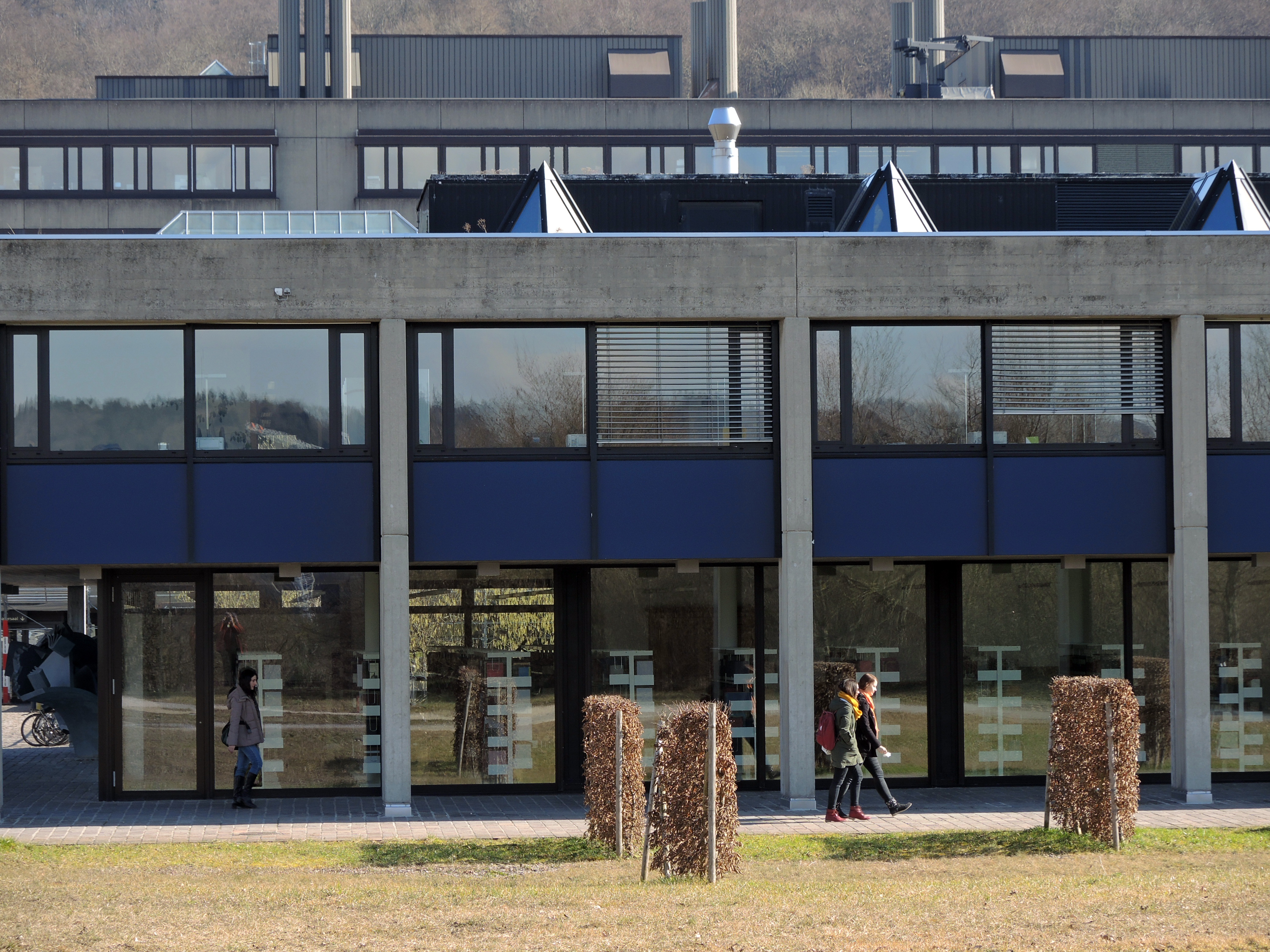
Staatsarchiv Zürich

The park was created as a natural landscape park of approximately 32 hectares (79 acres), being the largest recently-created park in Switzerland, and serving to the public and to the members of the university as a recreation area. Sized to its wide area of hills that protect the park on the streets immissions, the topography creates differentiated landscapes. The individual institute buildings are grouped in the upper park part on both sides of a central pedestrian axis, that is separated by green courtyards. The outer courtyards are interlocked with the surrounding parkland, which are characterized mainly by two reconstructed streams and the observation point on the excavation of the university buildings. The park is free of individual traffic, and the tapping is done entirely underground on both sides of the Winterthurerstrasse. A wide green bridge connects the upper to the lower part of the park and ends in a large staircase made of granite. The lower part of the park is dominated by a large artificial lake and non-urban-like meadows.

As of December 2014, Irchelpark comprises spacious grounds including the spacious lake, and in its natural state, surrounded streams and one separate pond, playground and lawns, seating areas and fire pits. Popular is also the sand plant for running and the lookout point, as well as sculptures created by Swiss artists, and the anthropological museum Anthropologisches Museum.

The Irchelpark is in fact a university campus, and therefore in the possession of the Canton of Zurich.

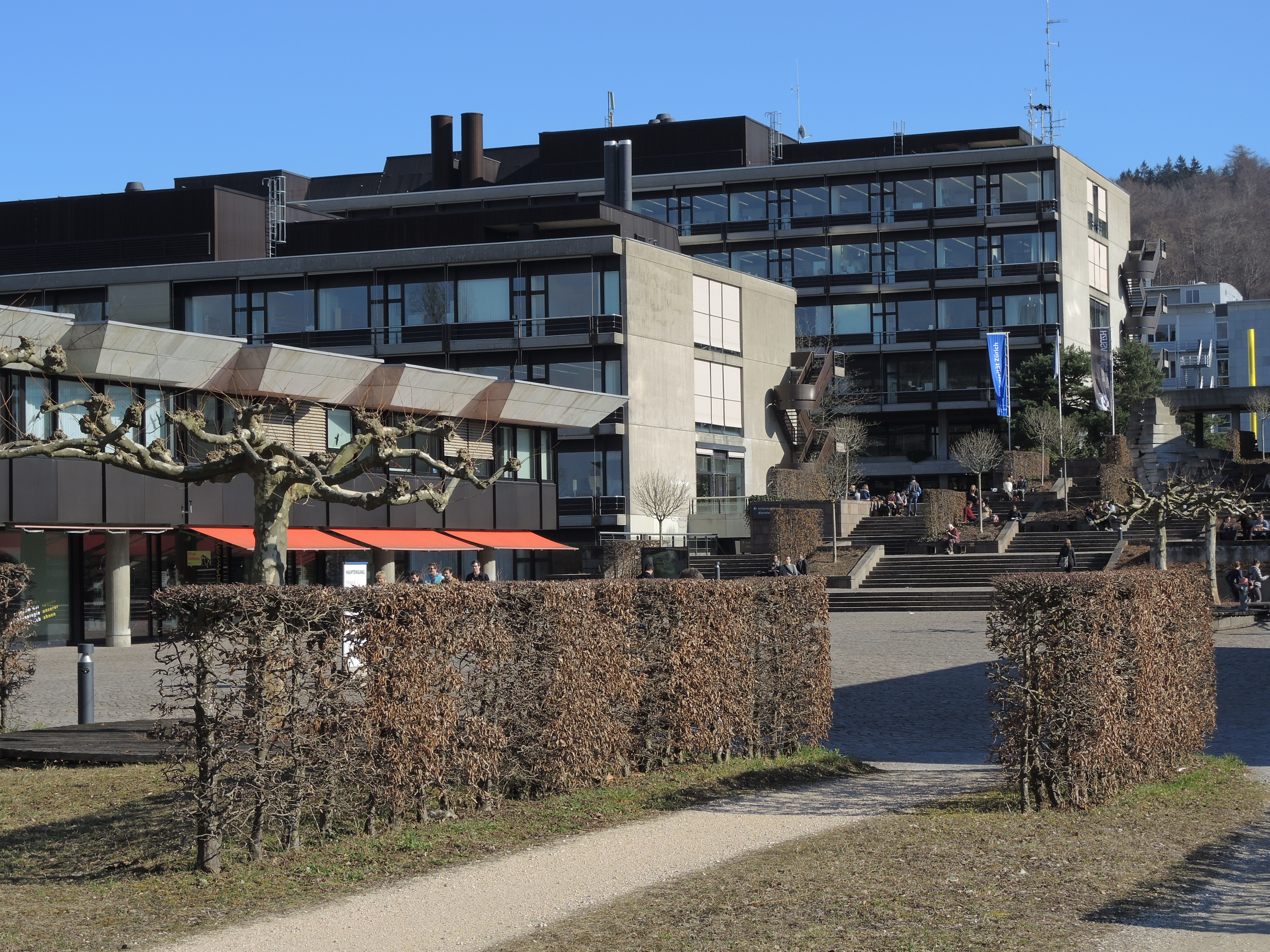
Campus and the anthropological museum

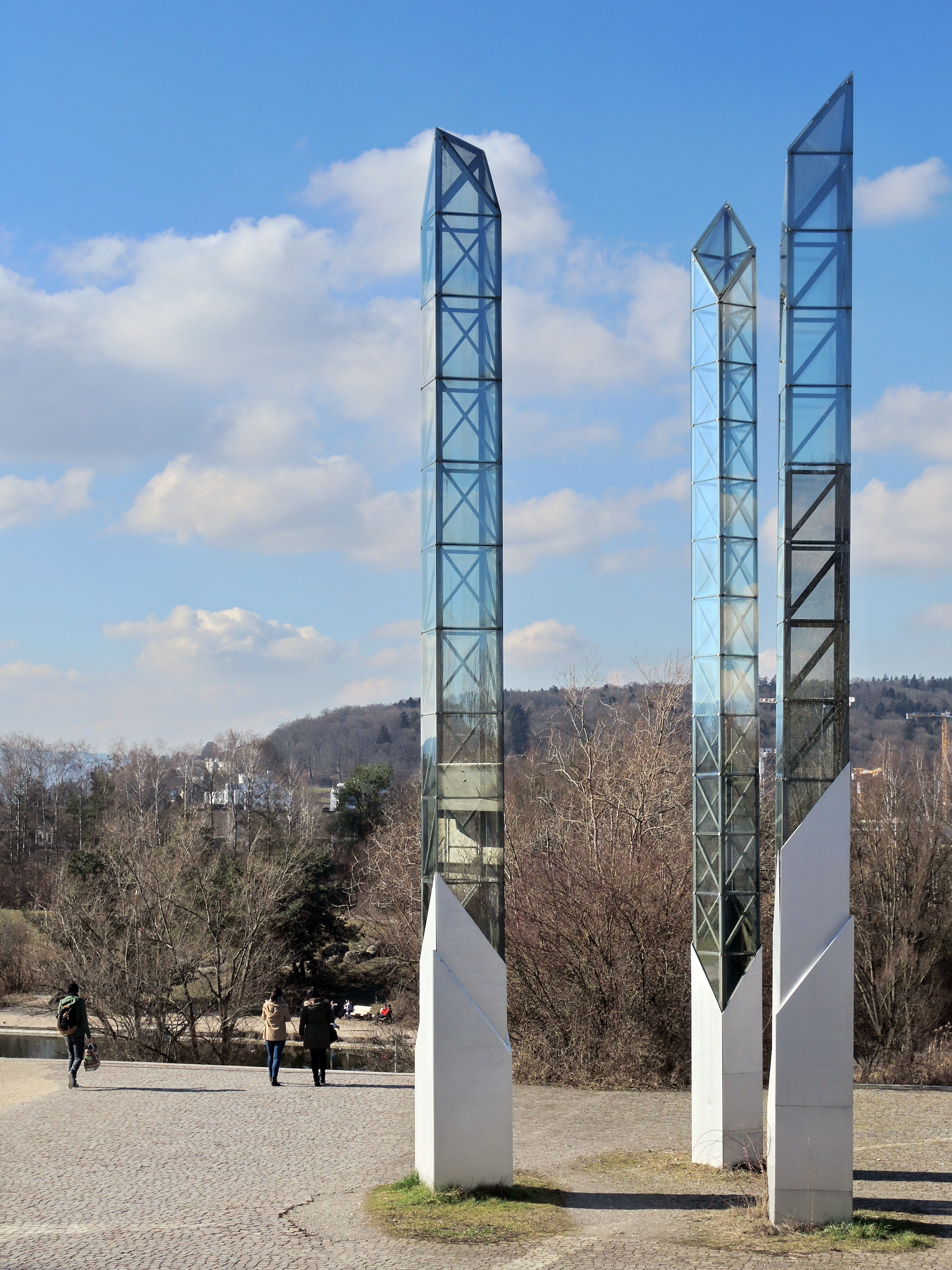
Sonnennadeln by Albert Cinelli

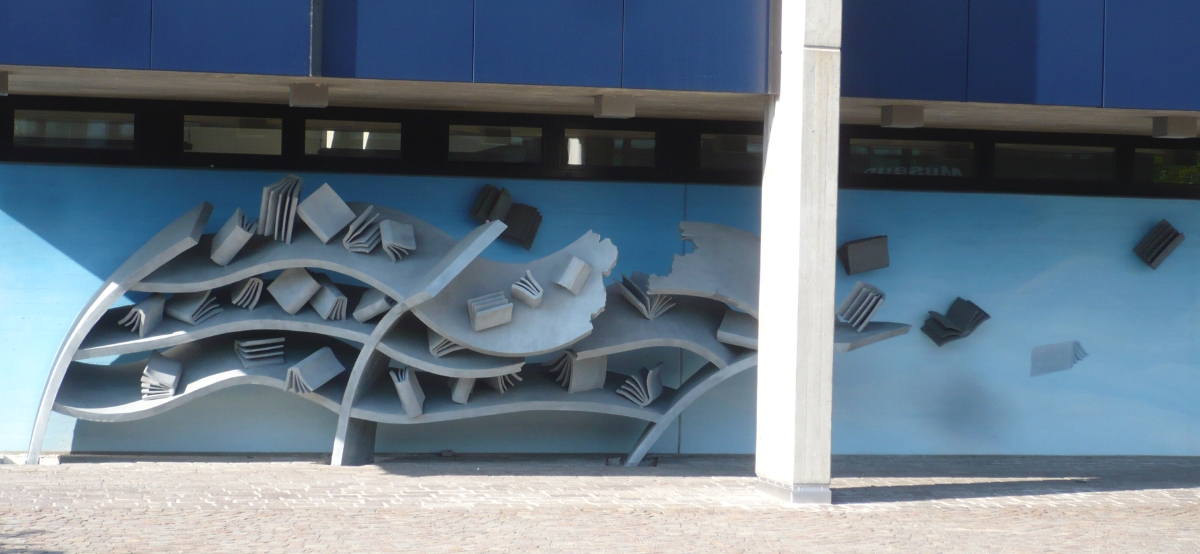
Sturm by Wolfgang Häckel

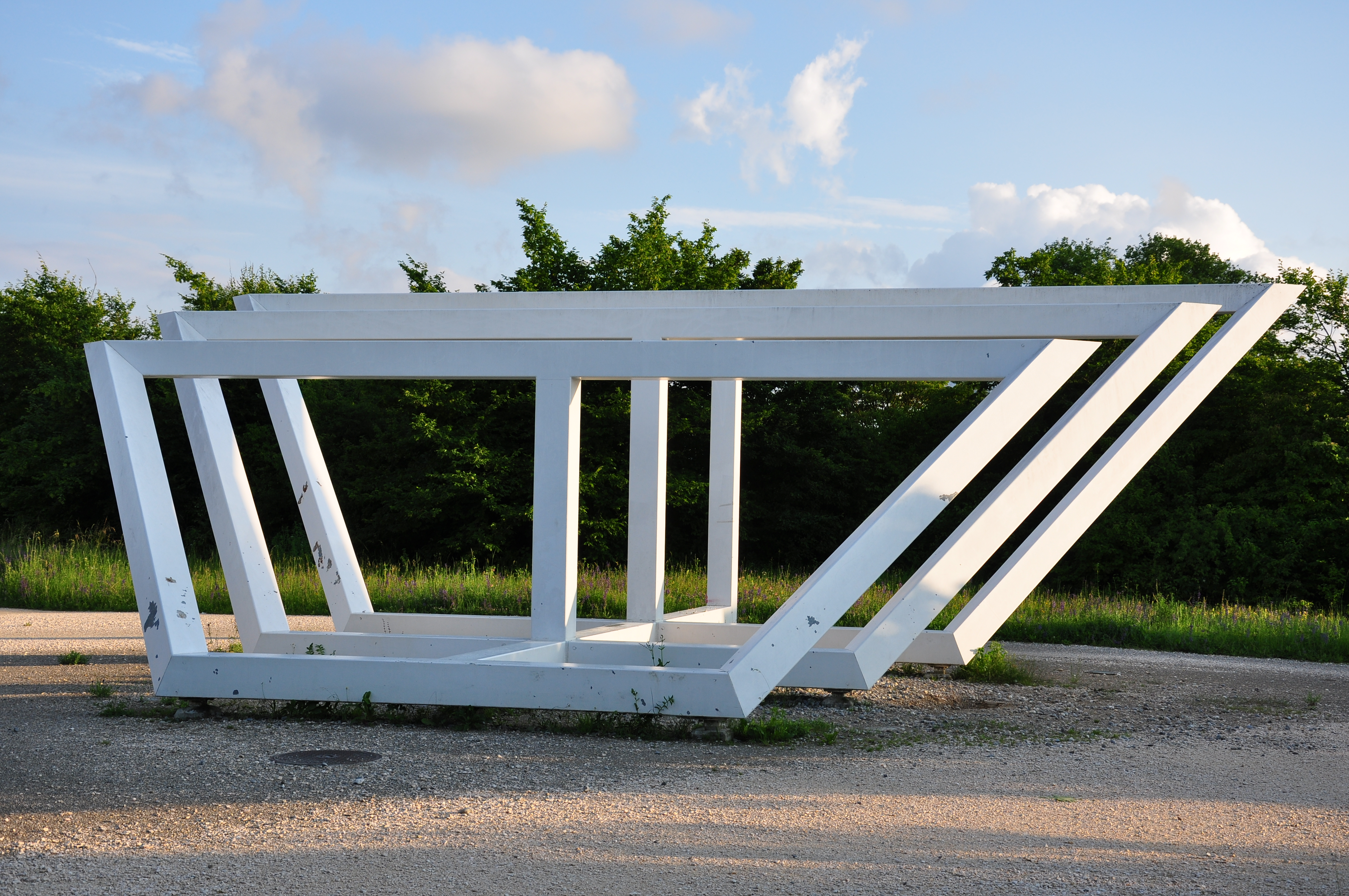
Raumwandler by Florin Granwehr

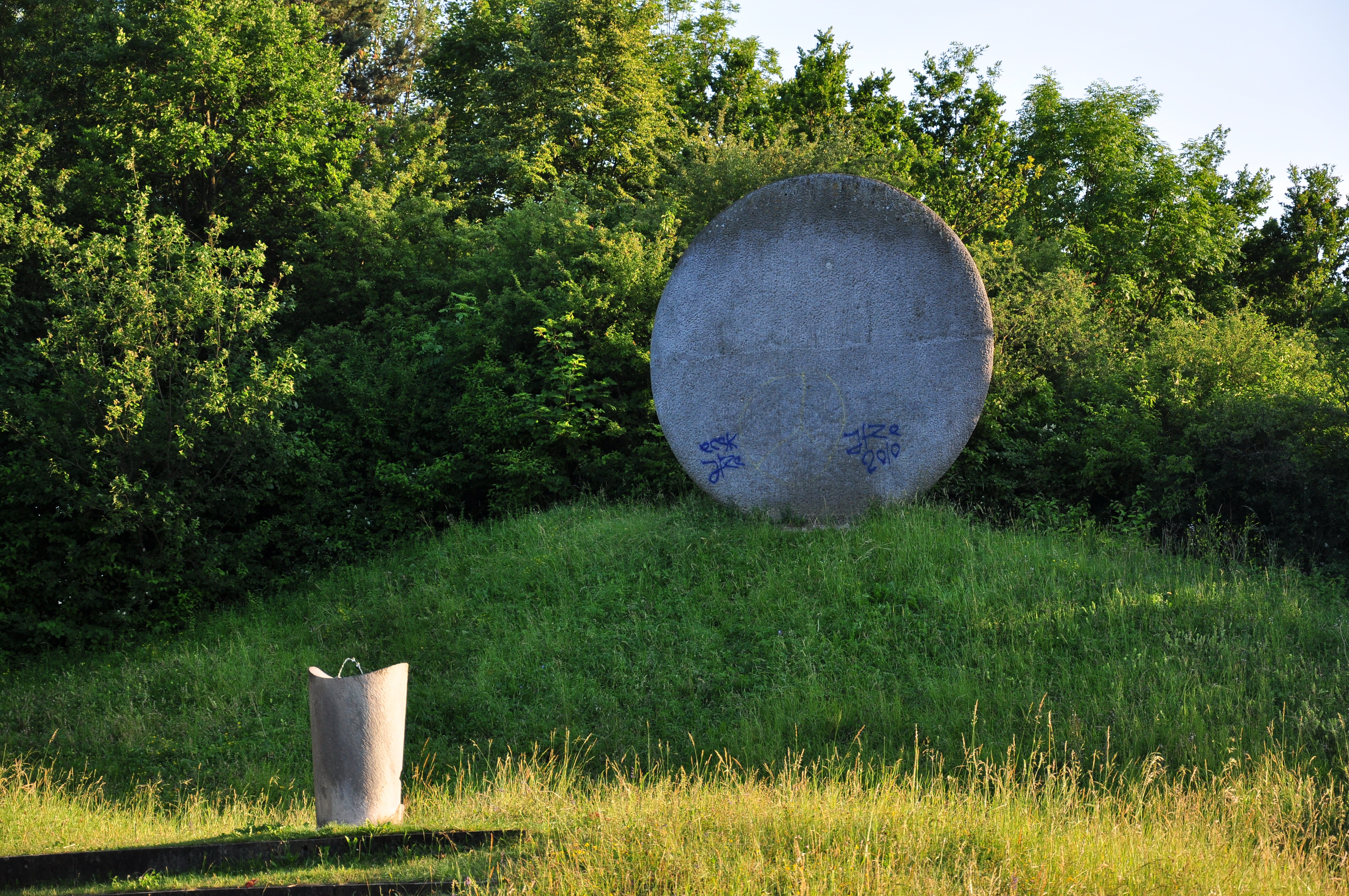
Bruder Sonne, Schwester Mond by Roland Hotz

== Safety ==
In 2010 there have been several cases of physical attack and harassment at Irchelpark after nightfall. Although the safety problem are still not completely resolved, there are no surveillance cameras installed in the park, and the University of Zurich publishes recommendations for the students who use the park at night to access the public transport stops from campus.

== Literature ==
- Gartenbiografien: Orte erzählen. vdf Hochschulverlag AG, ETH Zurich, Zurich 2013, ISBN 978-3-7281-3579-7.
- Walter Caflisch: 15 Jahre Parkanlage der Universität Zürich, Universität Zürich, Zurich 2001.
