= District 6 (Zurich) =

Kreis 6 District of the city of Zurich
- District
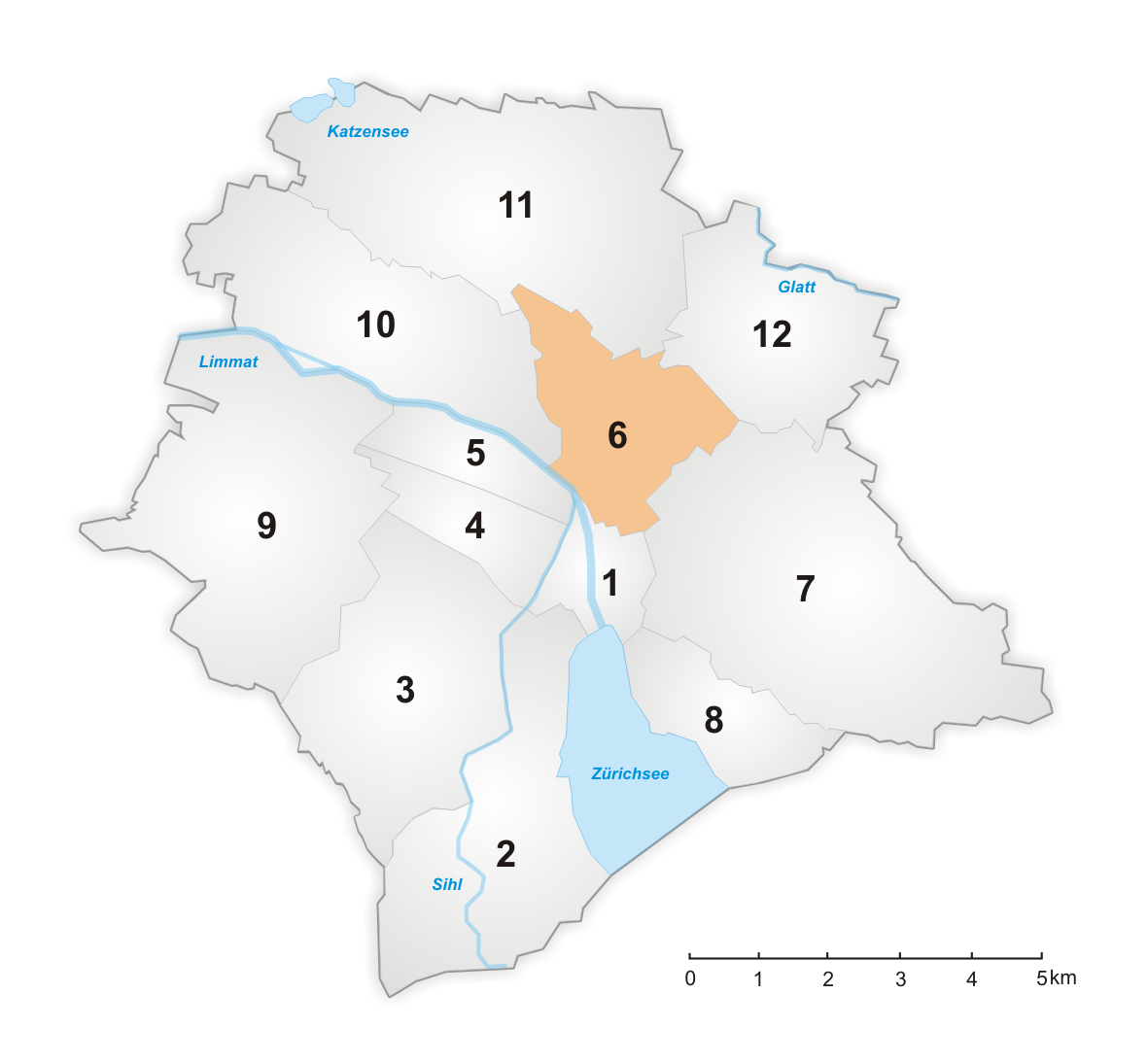
- Coordinates: 47.392°N 8.544°E
- Country: Switzerland
- Canton: Zurich
- City: Zurich

Area
  - Total: 5.1 km^{2} (2.0 sq mi)

Population (31 December 2005)
  - Total: 29,415
  - Density: 5,768/km^{2} (14,940/sq mi)
- District Number: 6
- Quarters: Unterstrass; Oberstrass

District 6 is a district north of the old town in the Swiss city of Zurich.

The district comprises the quarters Unterstrass and Oberstrass. Both entities were formerly municipalities of their own, but were incorporated into Zurich in 1893.
