= Theater Rigiblick =

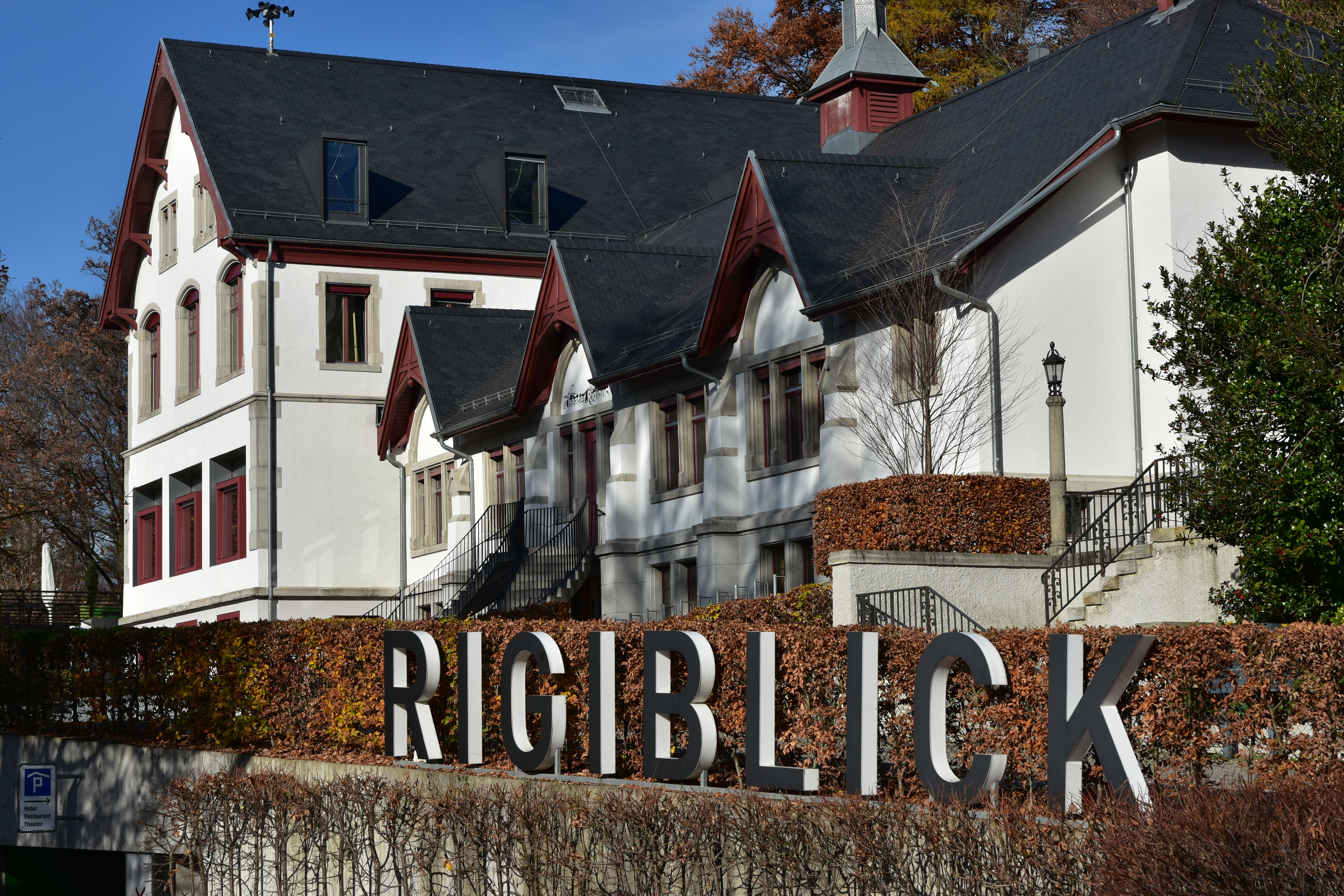
- Hotel, restaurant and Theater Rigiblick
- Interactive map of the Theater Rigiblick area

General information
- Status: active
- Type: Theatre
- Location: Zürich-Oberstrass, Switzerland, Germaniastrasse 99, CH-8044 Zürich
- Coordinates: 47°23′17.6″N 8°33′12.4″E
- Completed: 1901
- Renovated: 2003
- Owner: Stadt Zürich (theater); ZFV Unternehmungen (building)
- Landlord: City of Zürich and Zürcher Frauenverein (ZFV)

Technical details
- Floor count: 2

Other information
- Seating capacity: 160

Website
- Official website (in German)

Theater Rigiblick or Theatersaal Rigiblick is a theatre in the German-speaking Switzerland situated in Zürich-Oberstrass. Built in 1901 as the restaurant Rigiblick, the theater houses mainly guest performances, focussed on the dance theater. The theatre as institution is owned by the government of the city of Zürich, and the building by the Zürcher Frauenverein (ZFV) cooperative.

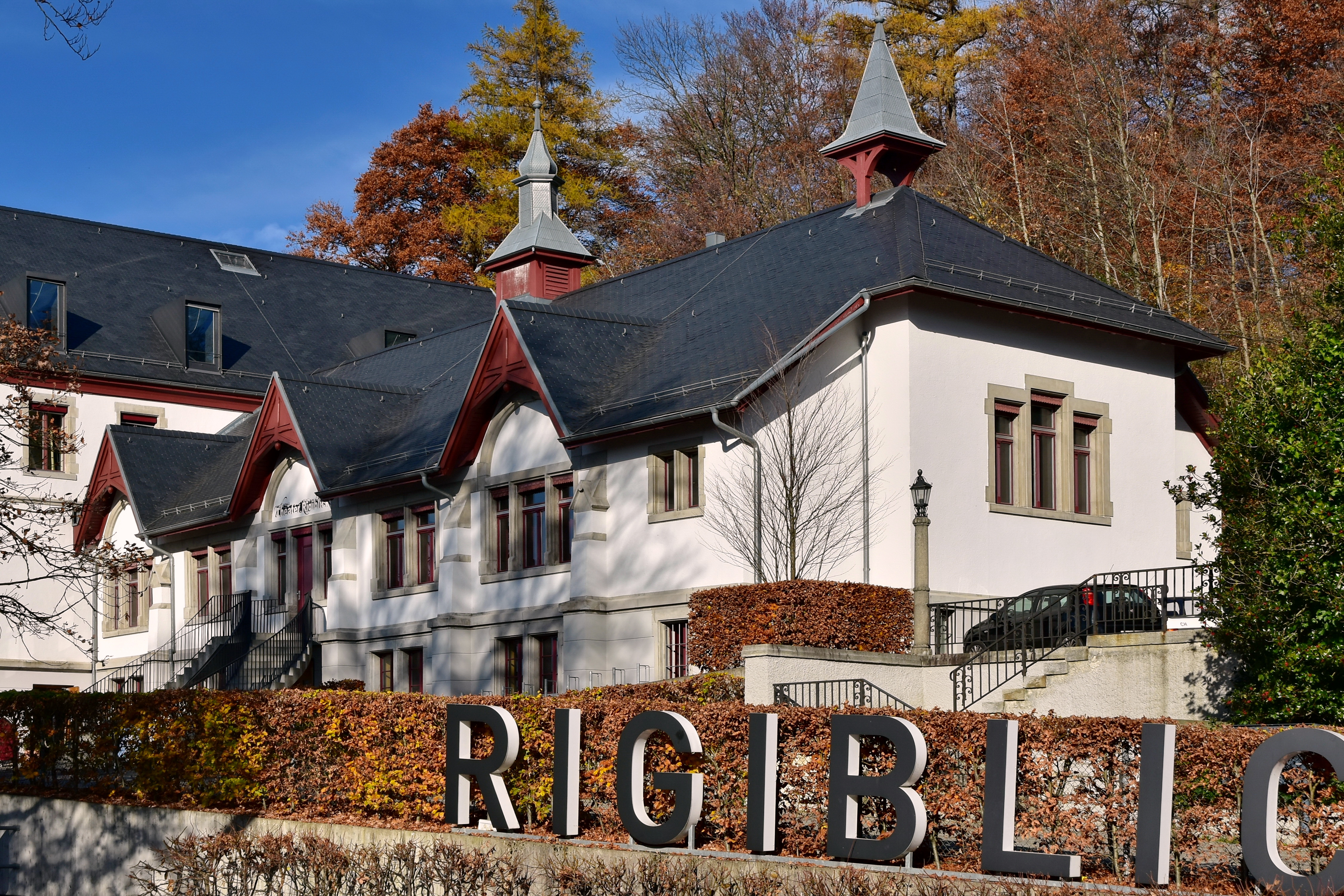
Theatersaal

== History ==
The Rigiblick building was built near the upper terminus of the present Seilbahn Rigiblick to house a restaurant with terrace and a large hall. It quickly became a social meeting place and a popular destination. In 1914 the Zürcher Frauenverein (literally: Zürich Women's Association) bought the building complex, which remained until 1976 in its possession, and then went over to the city government of Zürich. The hall was henceforth utilized primarily as a rehearsal room. Then there were plans to core the hall, intentionally to incorporate student housing.

Local residents successfully opposed the governmental plans, by establishing the Verein Quartierkultur im Kreis 6 (analogously "club district culture 6") in 1984, and the next year they founded the Verein Theatersaal Rigiblick (analogously "club auditorium Rigiblick"). Bruno Steiner became the theater's first director, and from spring 1986 the Vorbühne Zürich, first on a provisional basis, provided various events, chiefly theater and dance performances, concerts, readings, public discussions and exhibitions. Thanks to the urban subsidies, that have been doubled from 1987 (50,000 Swiss Francs per year) by 2003, the theater operation was continuously expanded. The performances were operated by a small budget and staff in voluntary work. Approximately one third of the performances were of Zürich artists (at a reduced loan) from the city districts of Oberstrass, Unterstrass and Fluntern, but artists from other parts of Switzerland and also from neighboring countries denied the majority of the theater program. The theater thus transformed from a place for neighborhood culture to a stage for events of pan-municipal interest. Despite the mixed program, the performances of the free dance scene was the theater's traditional focus: the Swiss professional association for dance and gymnastics' (German: Schweizerischer Berufsverband für Tanz und Gymnastik SBTG) organized decades before, from 1948 to 1968 regular international summer courses, which involved teachers from the whole European German-speaking linguistic area. The importance of the theater as a venue grew also after the "Depot Hardturm" and the "Theater West End" stages had been closed as venues for the free dance scene. In 2002 the ZFV-Unternehmungen cooperative (formerly Zürcher Frauenverein) repurchased the building complex, however, the hall of the theater remained in the possession of the city government of Zürich. An extensive renovation of the facility was carried out in the same year, and under the direction of the Swiss actor Daniel Rohr, on 13 January 2005 Tania Blixen's "Babette's Fest", a guest performance of the Zimmertheater Tübingen, opened the venue's news season.

Since 2003 the number of visitors has tripled to over 30,000 a year. About 250 events annually attract an audience far beyond the city of Zürich. Its artistic broad and high-quality program both guest international performances as well as a podium for young performers and for creative artists of various lines.

On occasion of Margrit Rainer's 100th birthday, in September 2014 premiered Euse Rainer chönnt das au!, a play respectively musical dedicated to Margrit Rainer, who's still popular although she died 32 years ago.

In the fiscal period 2014–2017 an annual municipal subsidy of CHF 490,000, composed of an operating contribution of CHF 305,000 and an abatement of rent of CHF 185,000 financed the theater's operations. The equity ratio of the theater is over 75%, and its staff consists of eight full-time jobs, other tasks, as the bar and technical staff, are carried out by voluntary workers of the Verein Theater Rigiblick association.

== Facilities ==
Rigiblick has a capacity of 160 seats, the stage measures 12 metres (39 ft) and 8 metres (26 ft) at a height of 5.7 metres (19 ft), and a small backstage.

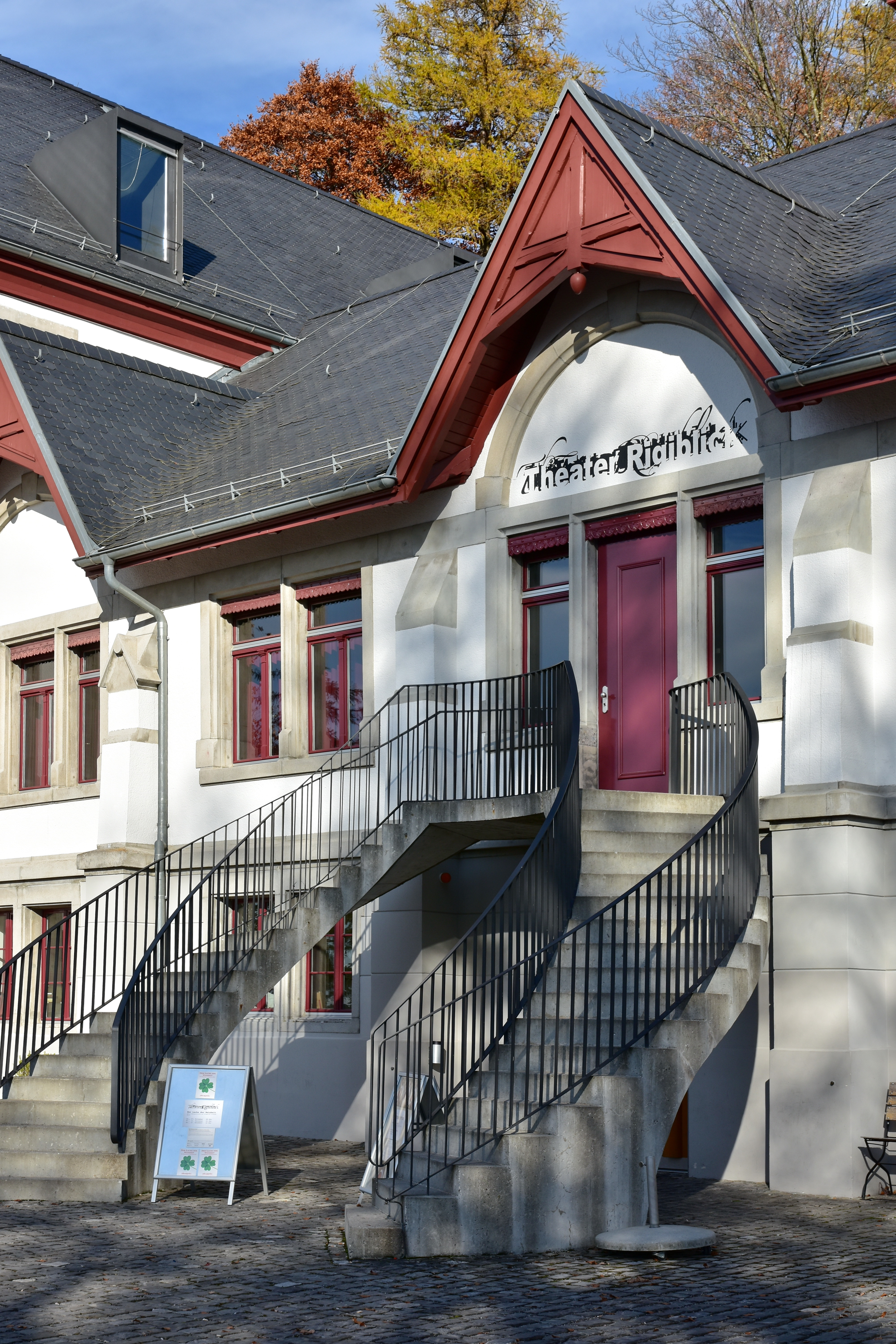
Entrance

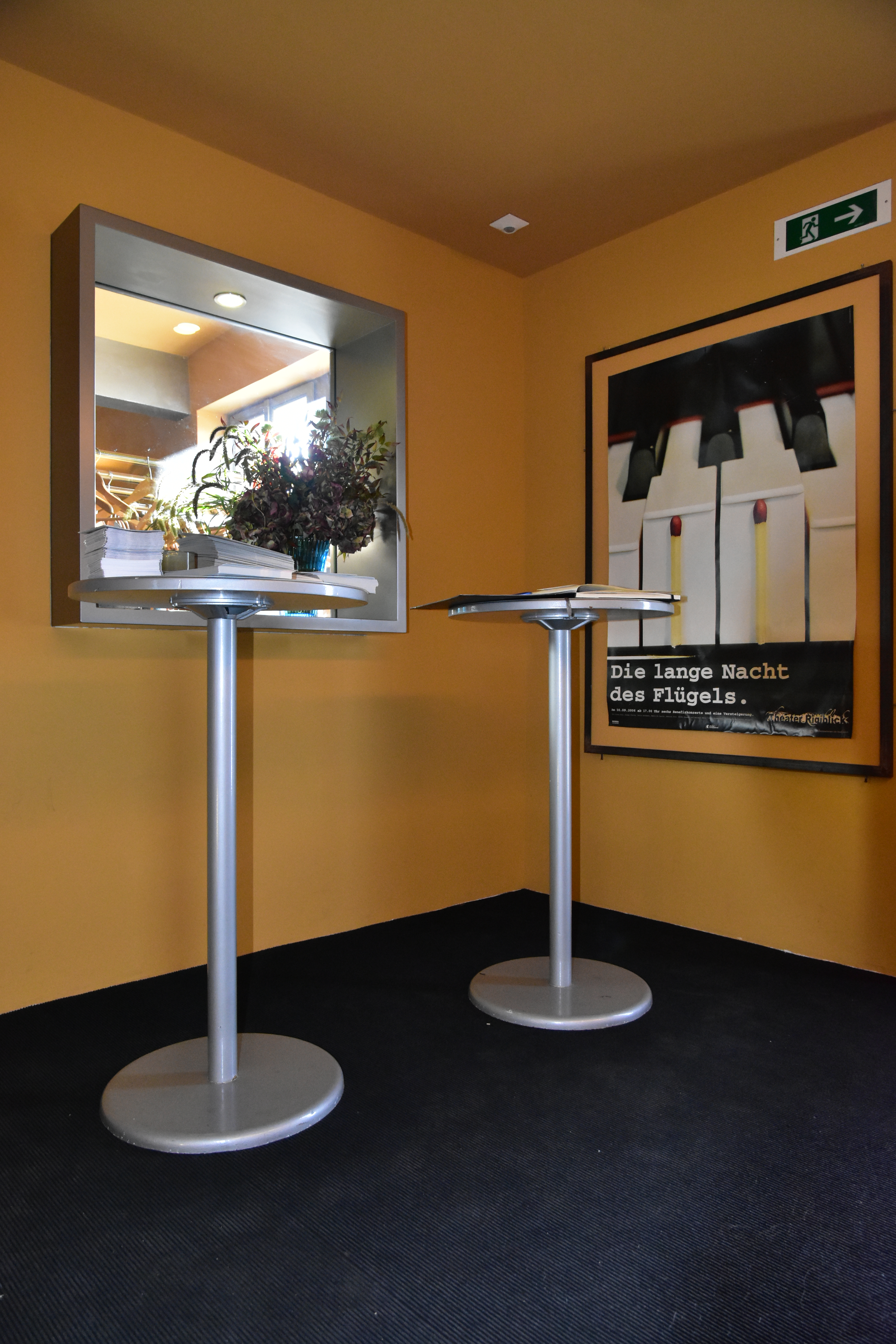
Lobby

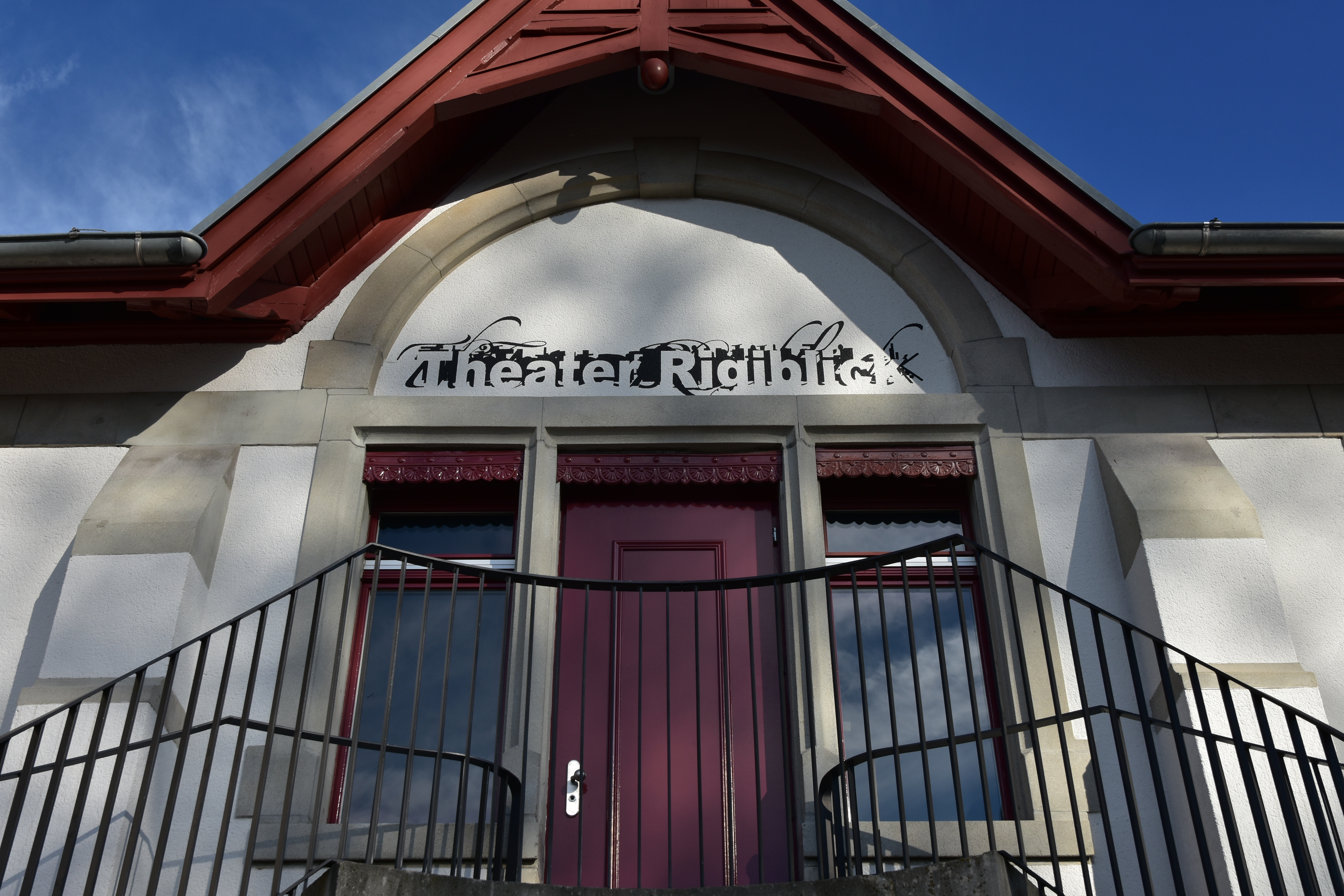

== Cultural heritage ==
The theatre respectively building is listed in the Swiss inventory of cultural property of national and regional significance as a Class B object of regional importance.

== Literature ==
- Tobias Hoffmann-Allenspach: Theaterlexikon der Schweiz. Volume 3, Chronos, Zürich 2005, ISBN 3-0340-0715-9.
