= Funicular Rigiblick =

Funicular railway in Zürich, Switzerland

Coordinates: 47.38578°N 8.548914°E

Seilbahn Rigiblick
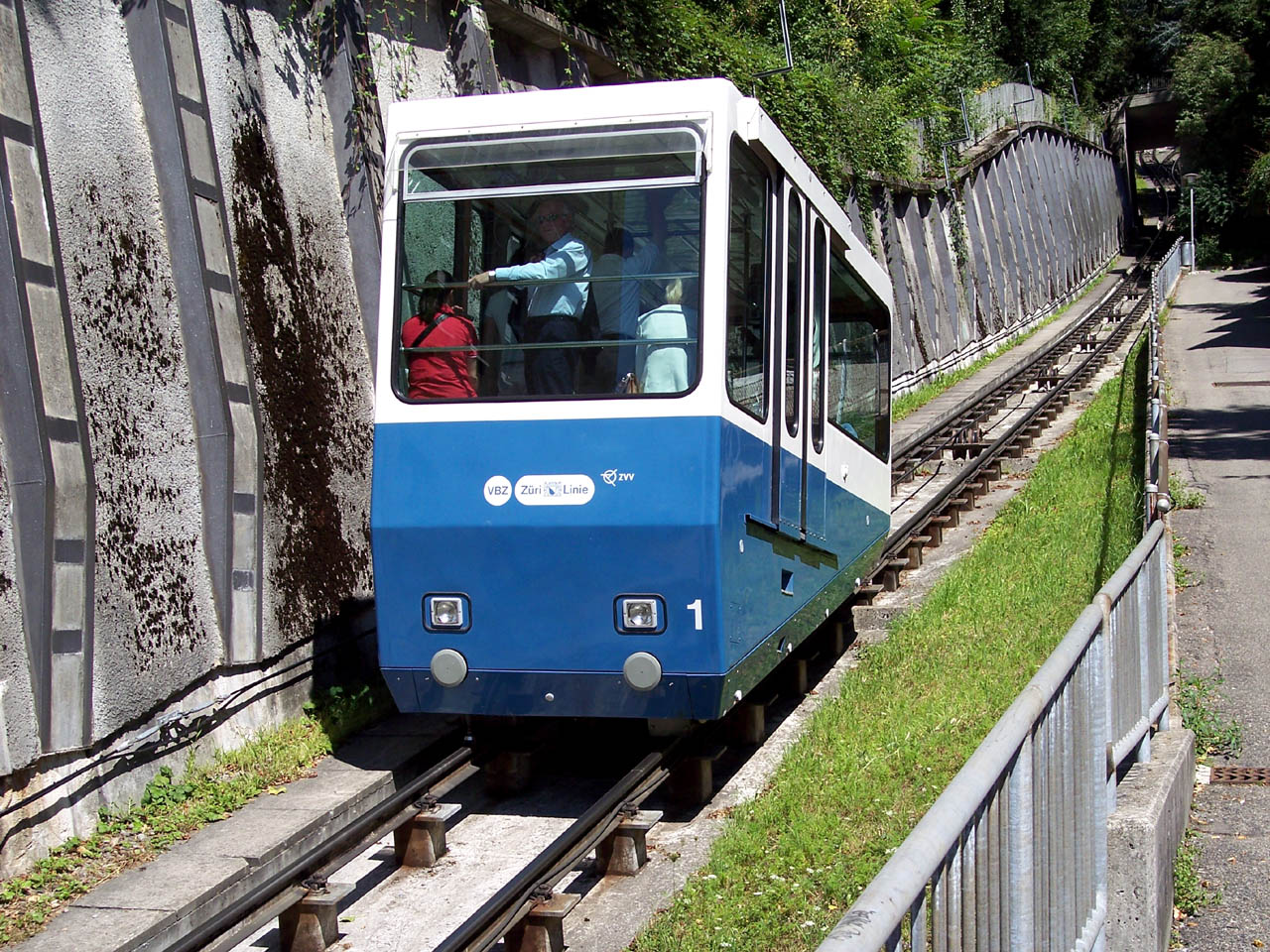

Overview
- Other name: Seilbahn Rigiviertel
- Status: In operation
- Owner: Verkehrsbetriebe Zürich
- Locale: Zürich, Switzerland
- Termini: "Zürich, Seilbahn Rigiblick" at Geissbergweg 3; "Zürich, Rigiblick" at Freudenbergstrasse 147
- Stations: 5 (including Goldauerstrasse, Hadlaubstrasse, Germaniastrasse)
- Website: stadt-zuerich.ch

Service
- Type: Funicular
- Operator: Verkehrsbetriebe Zürich
- Rolling stock: 2 for 30 passengers each
- Ridership: 700,000 (2025)

History
- Opened: 4 April 1901 (125 years ago)
- Extension: 29 May 1979

Technical
- Track length: 385 metres (1,263 ft) (since 1979)
- Number of tracks: 1 with passing loop
- Track gauge: Metre (3 ft 3 3/8 in)
- Electrification: from opening
- Maximum incline: 36%

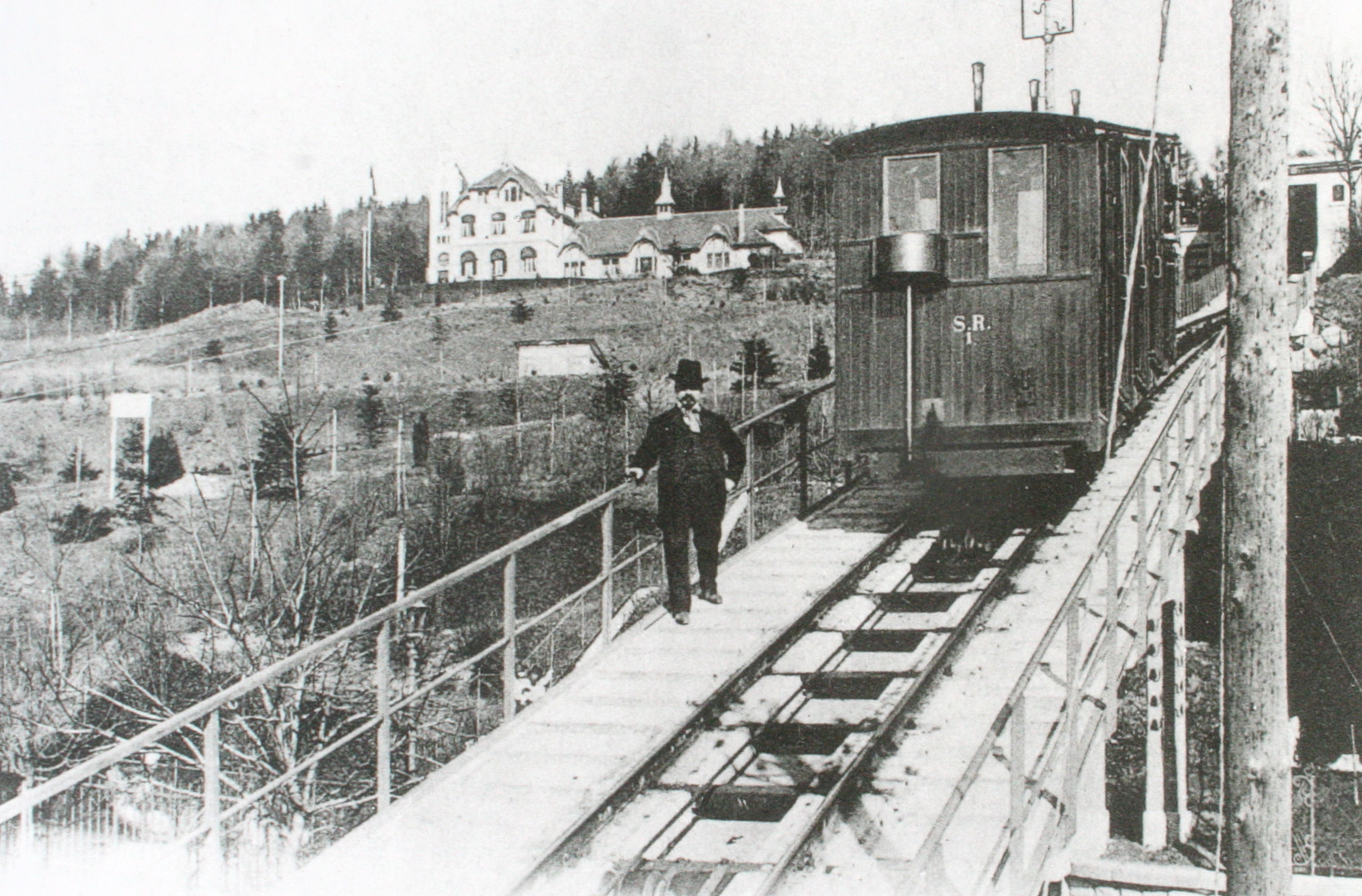
The line in 1901

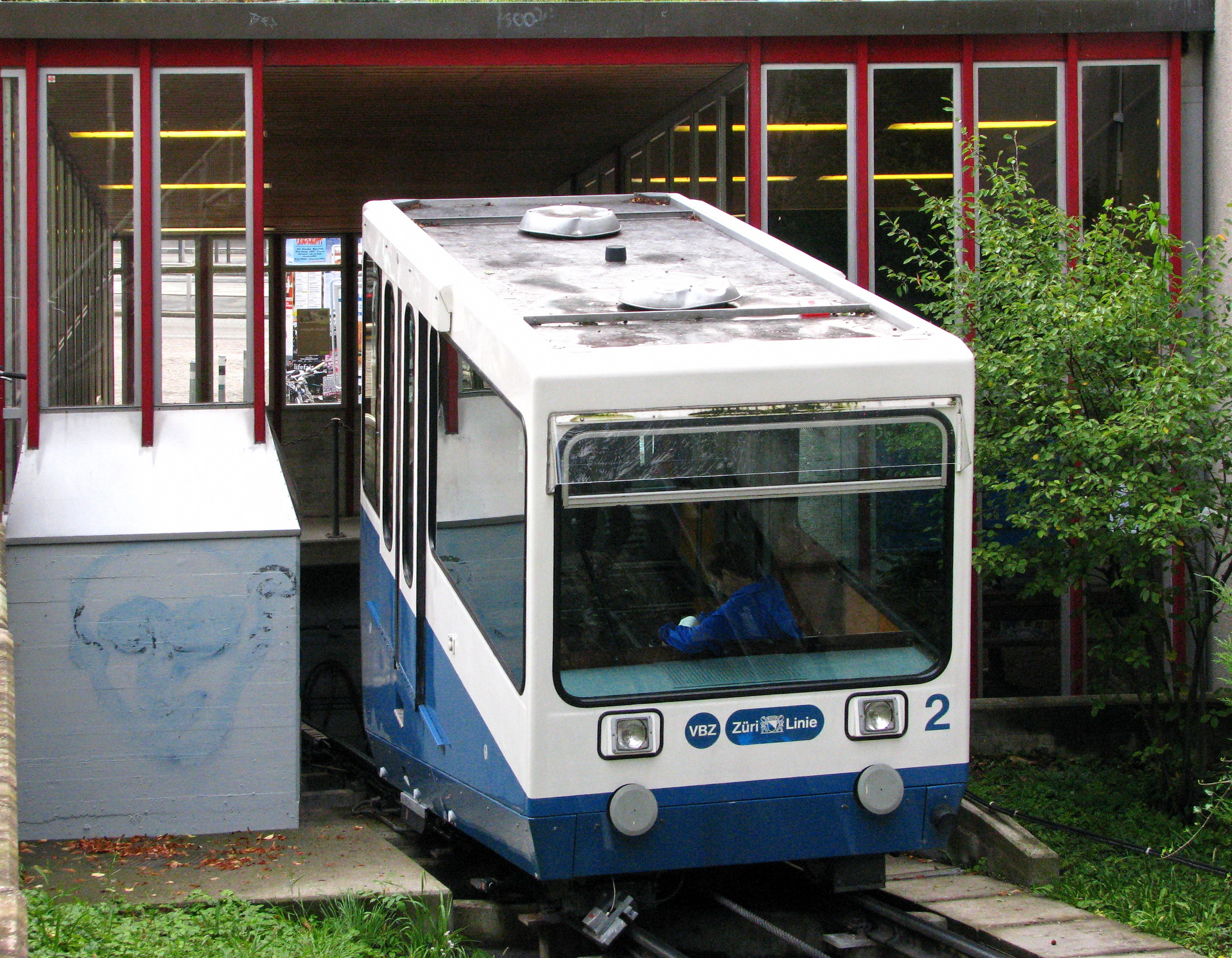
Car at lower station

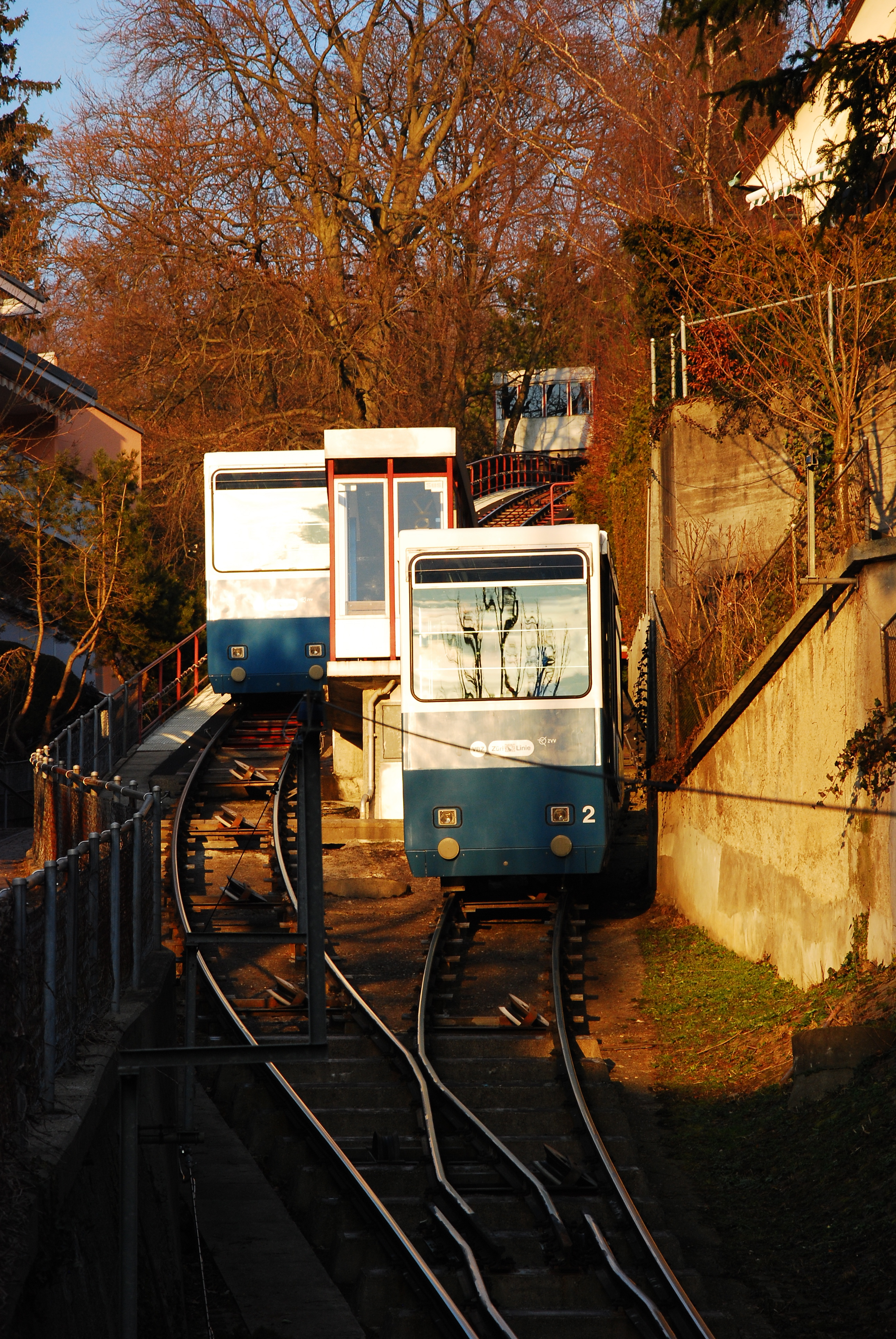
Intermediate station and passing loop

The Funicular Rigiblick (German: Seilbahn Rigiblick) is a funicular railway in the north-east of the city of Zürich, Switzerland. It links a lower station served by Zürich tram routes 9 and 10 and Zürich trolleybus route 33, with an upper station at Rigiblick on the Zürichberg hill.

The Rigiblick funicular is one of two funiculars within the city of Zürich, the other being the Polybahn funicular in the city centre. Additionally, the city's Dolderbahn rack railway was originally a funicular, until its conversion to rack working in the 1970s.

== History ==
The line first operated on 4 April 1901.

In the early 1950s it was refurbished, replacing the original wooden cable cars with metal bodied cars in a red colour scheme.

A further refurbishment in the late 1970s resulted in an 80 metres (262 ft) extension at the upper end of the line, and the introduction of the current cars, in blue and white.

Over summer 2025, the stations were renovated and the line received new wagons from Garaventa. The funicular resumed service on 26 September 2025.

== Operation ==
The line is operated by the Verkehrsbetriebe Zürich (VBZ), the municipal transport operator for the city of Zürich, and carries around 600 000 passengers per year. It has the following parameters:

Feature	Value
Number of cars	2
Number of stops	5 (2 terminal, 3 intermediate)
Configuration	Single track with passing loop
Mode of operation	Automated
Track length	385 metres (1,263 ft)
Rise	94 metres (308 ft)
Average gradient	25.3%
Maximum gradient	36%
Track gauge	1,000 mm (3 ft 3 3/8 in)
Capacity	30 passengers per car
Maximum speed	5 metres per second (16.4 ft/s)
Travel time	2 minutes (without stops)
Frequency	Every 6 minutes or more often if traffic demands

The standard Zürcher Verkehrsverbund zonal fare tariffs apply, with the whole of the line being within fare zone 110 (Zürich city).

== See also ==
- Public transport in Zurich
- List of funicular railways
- List of funiculars in Switzerland
