= Staatsarchiv Zürich =

State archives of the Swiss Canton of Zürich and its legal predecessors

- Staatsarchiv des Kantons Zürich (German)
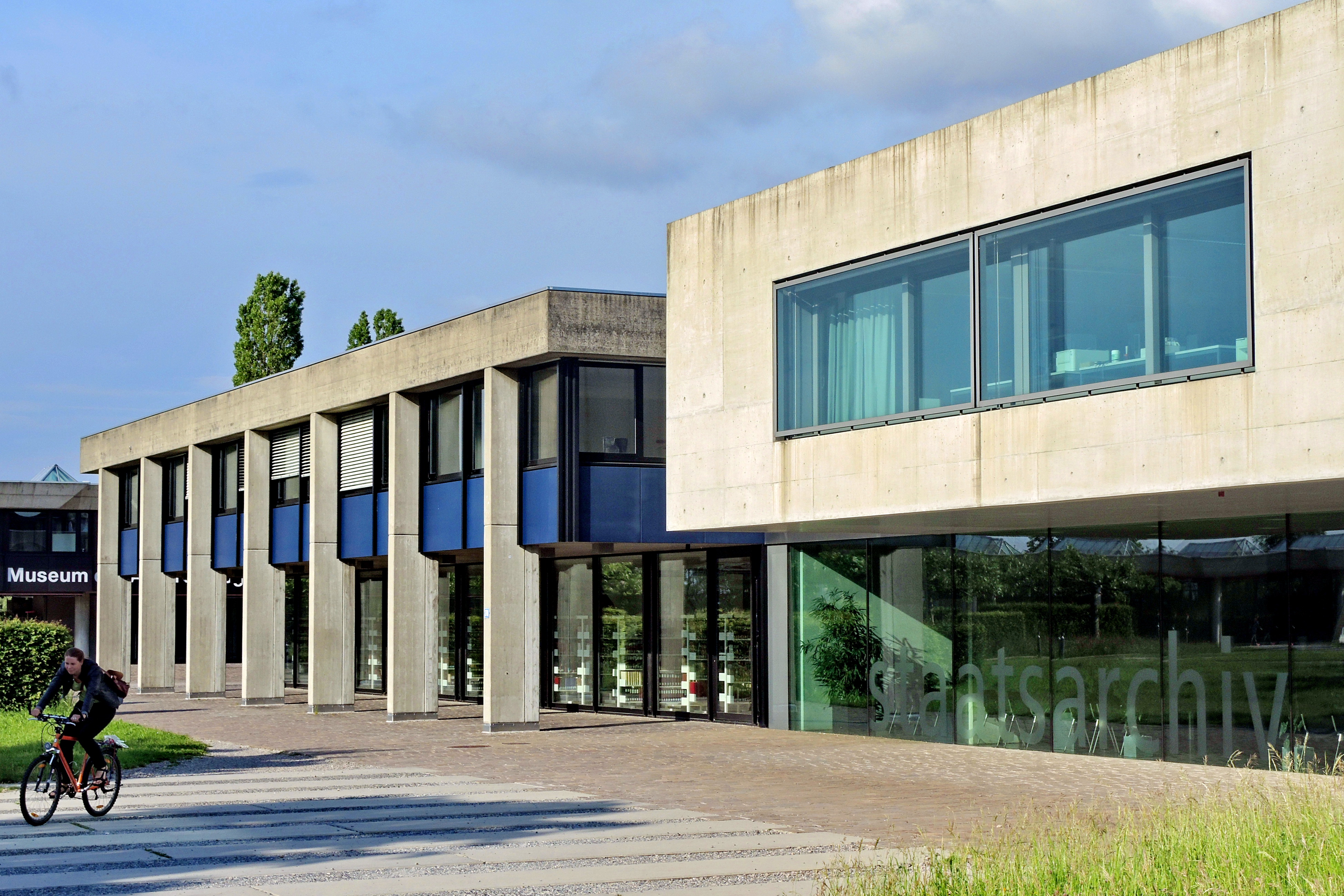
- Staatsarchiv Zürich, front view of the reading rooms and library
- Interactive map of Staatsarchiv Zürich
- 47°23′50″N 8°32′49″E
- Location: Irchelpark, Zürich, Switzerland

History
- Built: 1982

Site notes
- Governing body: City of Zürich

Staatsarchiv Zürich, formally the Staatsarchiv des Kantons Zürich, are the state archives of the Swiss Canton of Zürich and its legal predecessors, in particular the former city republic of Zürich.

== History ==
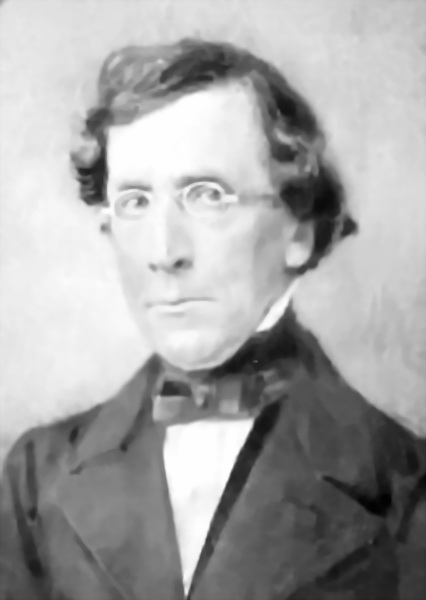
Gerold Meyer von Knonau, Staatsarchivar in 1837

The state archives host the administrative records of the Canton of Zürich, as it was established in 1803 in its current form. It also preserves the administrative records of the predecessor of the Canton of Zürich, so the records of the Helvetic Kanton Zürich, and in particular of the old city-state Zürich until 1798. In addition to being the "official memory of the administration", it is a versatile documentation and facility for scientific research and for the public. The 4 February 1837 marked the beginning of a new era in Zürich's archives, when Hans Jakob Ammann was elected by the cantonal authorities as the director of the Staatsarchiv. He succeeded the previous "registrar" historian Gerold Meyer von Knonau, who was later given the title Staatsarchivar (literally: state archivist), as he first started to merge various special archives to a central archive, among them of Fraumünster, Grossmünster and the former city council, and further non-official archives, but also of the Grand Council (now Kantonsrat), and the Government and cantonal Supreme Court, as well as the documents of the former Kappel and Rüti monasteries and the cantonal Reformed churches. Since 1837, therefore all cantonal, including all municipalities of the canton of Zürich oriented activities have to be recorded and stored by the Staatsarchiv.

== Archives and activities ==
Staatsarchiv is the archive of the public institutions of the Canton of Zurich, so the cantonal parliament, the government, the cantonal central and district administration and the courts and institutions. It stores, opens and permanently preserves the lore worthy documents. As a historical archive, it also keeps the administrative records of the ancient city-state of Zurich since the European Middle Ages. The archives are supplemented by documents stocks of private origin, among them companies, associations, guilds, families and individuals. The retention of these documents allows to make the state action understandable, enables historical research and the use of cultural interests in the broadest sense, accessible for all interested parties in accordance with legal provisions. In addition, it operates as a public reference library with the focus on "History of the Canton of Zurich" and "archival science". It supervises and also advises the municipalities of the canton in matters of archiving.

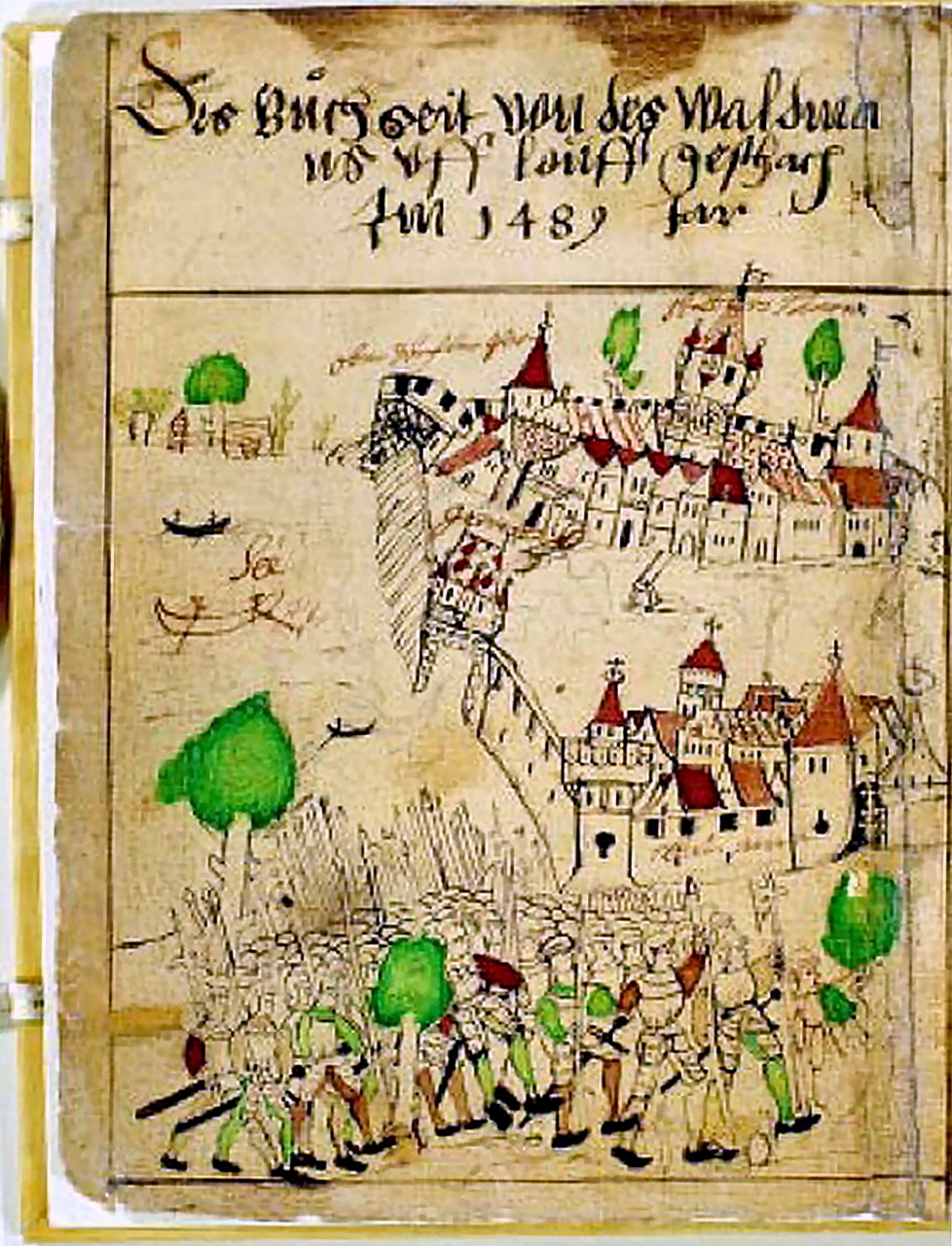
So-called Waldmannhandel of 1489, Hönggerbericht of 1500

Staatsarchiv preserves mostly unique and large parts of medieval handwritten documents, but some documents related to the city of Zürich are still housed at the Haus zum Rechberg at Neumarkt, Zürich.

The archival holdings date back to 853 AD, as Zürich was the imperial Pfalz Turicum, thenafter an imperial city, and a federal center of the Reformation in Zürich. This history has been reflected in the holdings of the archive. Noteworthy is the continuity of the Zürich archives, that owes to the absence of large disasters and wars. For example, the government protocols, which can be described as the backbone of history, are nearly completely preserved since the late 15th century. The newer stocks of the Canton of Zurich (since 1798/1803 and since 1831) started quantitatively to be the main focus of the tradition in the archives. Every year, the archives records approximately 800 metres (2,625 ft) linear meters of new content in paper. The increased volume origins by the cantonal authorities, as cantonal council, councillor including central and district administration, notaries, cantonal institutions, and courts. In addition, there are also more and more private documents related to the modern history of the Canton of Zurich, so company archives, individual documents, and heritage documents in the widest sense. Currently, more than 30 kilometres (19 mi) of paper files are stored, and terabytes of electronic files, but just partially accessible to the public.

As of 3 October 2017, all documents of the former city republic of Zürich back to 1803 have been digitalized and are accessible to the public.

== Collections and curiosities ==
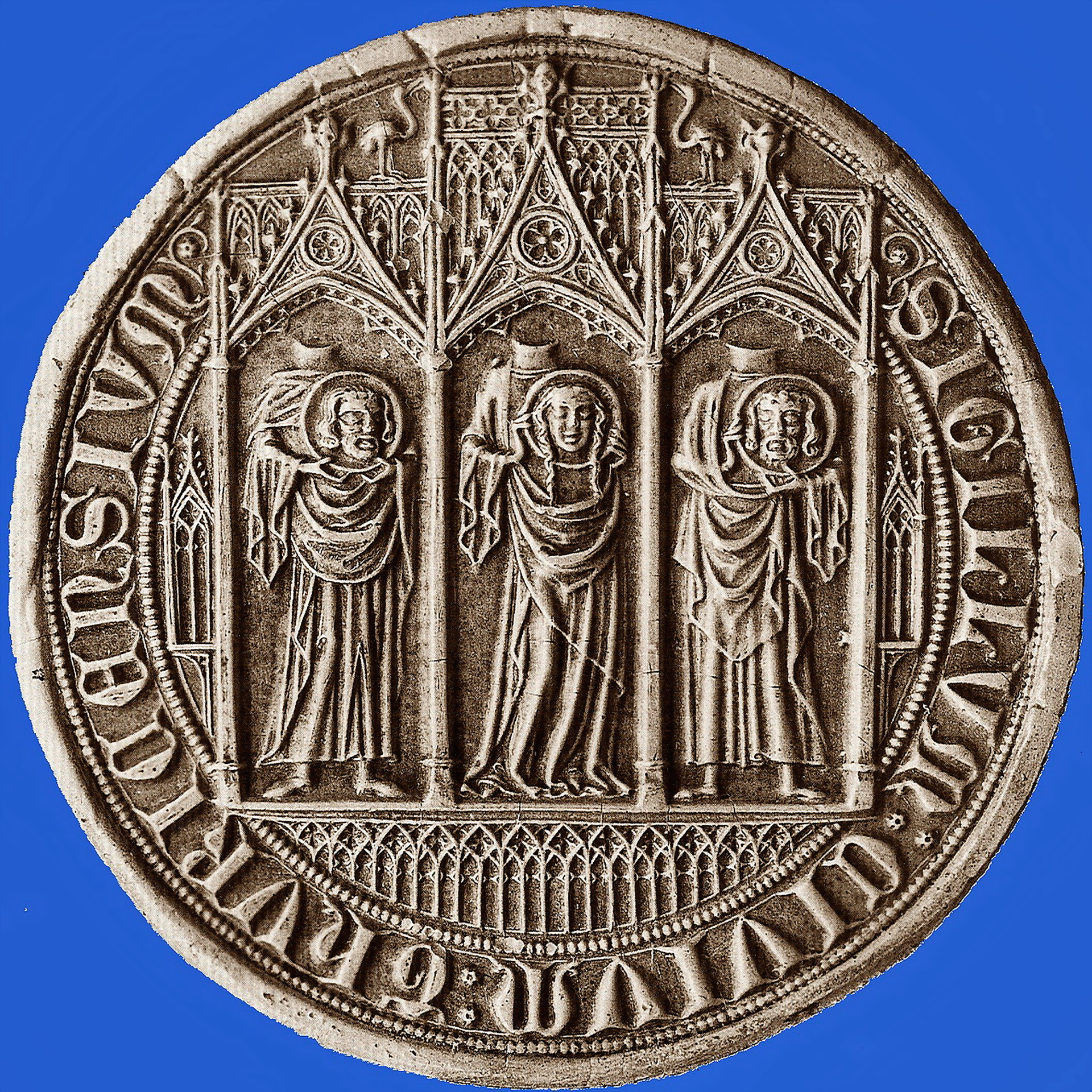
Seal stamp of 1347

Between 1888 and 1978, more than 50,000 inventive and innovative Zürich citizens applied for more than 50,000 patents at the Swiss Federal Patent Office, united in the collection Patentschriften. Among them a bathing suit invented by Hermann Brupbacher in 1894, described as a "bathing suit for people who are unfamiliar with swimming...in which floating bodies made of rubber tubes filled with crushed cork pieces are sewn in". There are not only curiosities to be found, there are also patents for a motor vehicle registered by F. Vogel in Küsnacht in 1905, or the patent for the nuclear reactor of the Sulzer Winterthur industries from 1957. The digitized patent specifications, which in most cases also include a drawing, are available online. The seal stamp of the city seal of 1347, which shows the three saints Felix, Regula and Exuperantius, is the oldest example of the collection Objekte. It also includes younger state objects such as the Zürich standard weight, a dog measuring device from 1909, or the ballot box of the cantonal council of 1831, which was used to vote on petitions for pardon. The Plansammlung collection of plans consists of around 25,000 documents dating back to the 17th century, and this valuable collection of plans can also be viewed online.

== Organization ==
As a public institution, the state archives are part of the cantonal administration and associated to the cantonal Department of Justice and Interior (Direktion der Justiz und des Innern). The archives houses also a scientific library, a library housing all magazines published in the canton of Zürich, reading rooms, and an administrative service to handle also the public access by all interested people. In addition to the archive materials, a digital library is provided, as well a collection of maps and many more 'worthy' content.

The archives are structured into five sections, including

- evaluation, selection and acquisition of documents;
- order and distribution of the documents received;
- advice and support for customers;
- conservation of the stocks;
- detailed indexing and publishing of key sources.

The staff comprises around 75 employees including historians and restorers. Other responsibilities include assisting in the genealogy, the edition of primary sources, the inventory of monuments, the creation of archival aids for authorities and communities, and the maintenance of various collections, among them maps, charts and pamphlets. As of March 2018, Beat Gnädinger is the director of the Staatsarchiv Zürich.

== Locations ==
Until 1982, the state archives were housed in buildings that had been intended as a temporary, or at least not built for archive purposes: From 1837 to 1876 at the Fraumünster abbey at the site of the present town house, from 1876 to 1919 in an annex of the governmental Obmannamt building (the former Barfüsser abbey, as of today the cantonal courthouse), and from 1919 to 1982 in the choir of the Predigern abbey, as of today the university's library.

Since 1982 the archives are concentrated at the Irchelpark campus of the University of Zürich, in a building specifically constructed for their needs. An extension was obtained in March 2006, the subsequent conversion of the archive building was completed in mid-2007. The building comprises six floors, of which four are located underground, to ensure safe storage, stable climatic conditions, contemporary protection from fire and water damage, and the maximum protection for the archives.

Because the capacities are expected to be exhausted again in 2019, a further extension was approved by the parliament of the Canton of Zürich in March 2016; 25 million Swiss Francs for the construction of Bau 3 (stage 3). The present capacity of 16 kilometres (9.9 mi) running archive room will be expanded by a subterranean construction comprising a capacity of further 2,000 metres (6,562 ft). Adjacent to the present building (stage 2), a cafeteria and conference rooms will be built, including a solar power plant.

== Cultural heritage of national importance ==
Staatsarchiv Zürich is listed in the Swiss inventory of cultural property of national and regional significance as a Class A object of national importance.

== Literature ==
- Christian Sieber: Die gedruckten Bestände im Staatsarchiv des Kantons Zürich. Zürich 2007.
- Meinrad Sutter, Agenes Hohl Otto Sigg, Thomas Weibel, Reto Weiss, Josef Zweifel, Werner Reich (photos): Staatsarchiv des Kantons Zürich: Kleine Zürcher Verfassungsgeschichte 1218–2000. Published by Direktion der Justiz und des Innern, Chronos, Zürich 2000, ISBN 3-9053-1403-7.
- Otto Sigg: Karten und Pläne als Quelle zur Industrie- und Umweltgeschichte, am Beispiel der Bestände des Staatsarchivs Zürich. In: Cartographica Helvetica 6 (1992) p. 29–31.
