= Zurich Letten railway station =

Former rail station in Zurich, Switzerland

Coordinates: 47.387164°N 8.533475°E

Zurich Letten
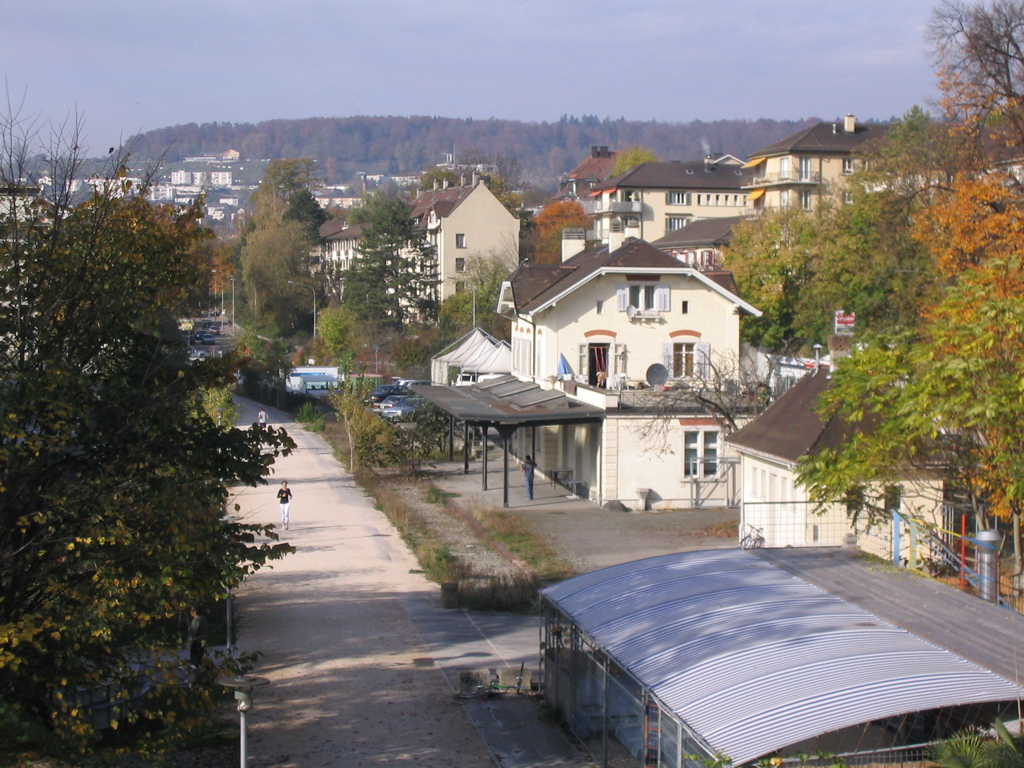
- The station today. The viaduct over the river is in the distance, whilst the entrance to the tunnel is below and behind the photographer

General information
- Location: Switzerland
- Elevation: 409 m (1,342 ft)
- Line: Old route of the Lake Zurich right-bank railway line

Construction
- Structure type: at-grade

History
- Opened: 1894
- Closed: 1989
- Electrified: 1926
Location

Zurich Letten (German: Bahnhof Zürich Letten) is a former railway station in the Swiss city of Zurich. It is situated on the old route of the Lake Zurich right bank railway (Rechtsufrige Zürichseebahn) from Zürich HB to Rapperswil via Tiefenbrunnen.

Radical changes to the local railway geography in conjunction with the opening of the Zurich S-Bahn system led to the closure of the station in 1989, but the station building still exists, and the trackbed and viaducts are used as a pedestrian path/cycling route.

The former railway station is adjacent to the Letten Power Station on the Limmat.

== History ==
Map showing changes to the rail routes

As built in 1894, the right bank railway was a single track line that departed from Zürich HB (main station) in a westerly direction, before performing a clockwise 270 degrees turn via the Aussersihl Viadukt and a bridge over the River Limmat. It then passed through Letten station and the Letten Tunnel in order to reach Stadelhofen station.

By rail, the distance between Zurich HB and Stadelhofen was some 5 kilometres (3.1 mi), despite the fact that they are only 1.5 kilometres (0.93 mi) apart in a straight line.

With the opening of the Zurich S-Bahn in 1990, the Letten Tunnel was replaced by the Hirschengraben Tunnel, which provided a direct route under the Limmat to Stadelhofen through new low-level platforms at Zurich HB .

After the new route opened, Letten station was closed and the original railway line and tunnel fell into disuse. During the 1980s and early 1990s, the adjacent Platzspitz and later also the vacated Letten station area became a centre for Zurich's drug scene, until this was driven away by police action in 1995.

The railway line was closed in 1989, by 2002 the tracks had been removed, and from 2002-2004 the tunnel was filled in and sealed off. The station building, built in 1893, is under cultural heritage management.

== Current use ==
The Letten Tunnel has been closed off and filled to prevent collapse. Its northern entrance is still visible.

The former track bed through Letten station, the bridge across the River Limmat, and the part of the Aussersihl Viadukt on the line between Industriequartier and Letten have been converted into a pedestrian and cycle route (the line between Zürich HB and Oerlikon via Wipkingen of the Aussersihl Viadukt is still operative). Since 2010, the areas below the arches of the Aussersihl Viadukt house shops and restaurants (Im Viadukt).

The station building is currently used by the publishers of the magazine Transhelvetica, but other future uses for the station building are under discussion, with use as a theatre and/or restaurant proposed.

== Gallery ==
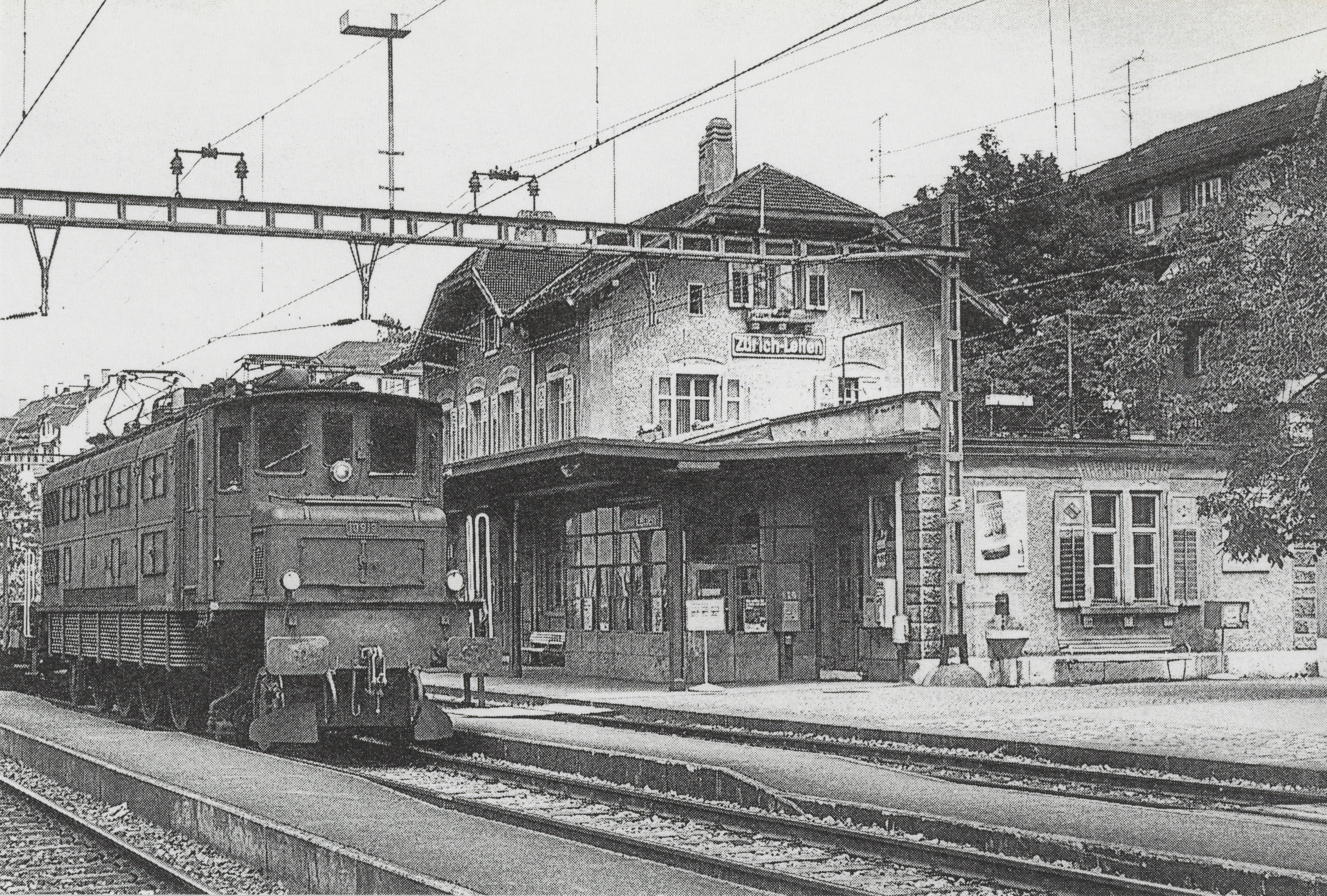
Locomotive of a cargo train at Letten station (1985)

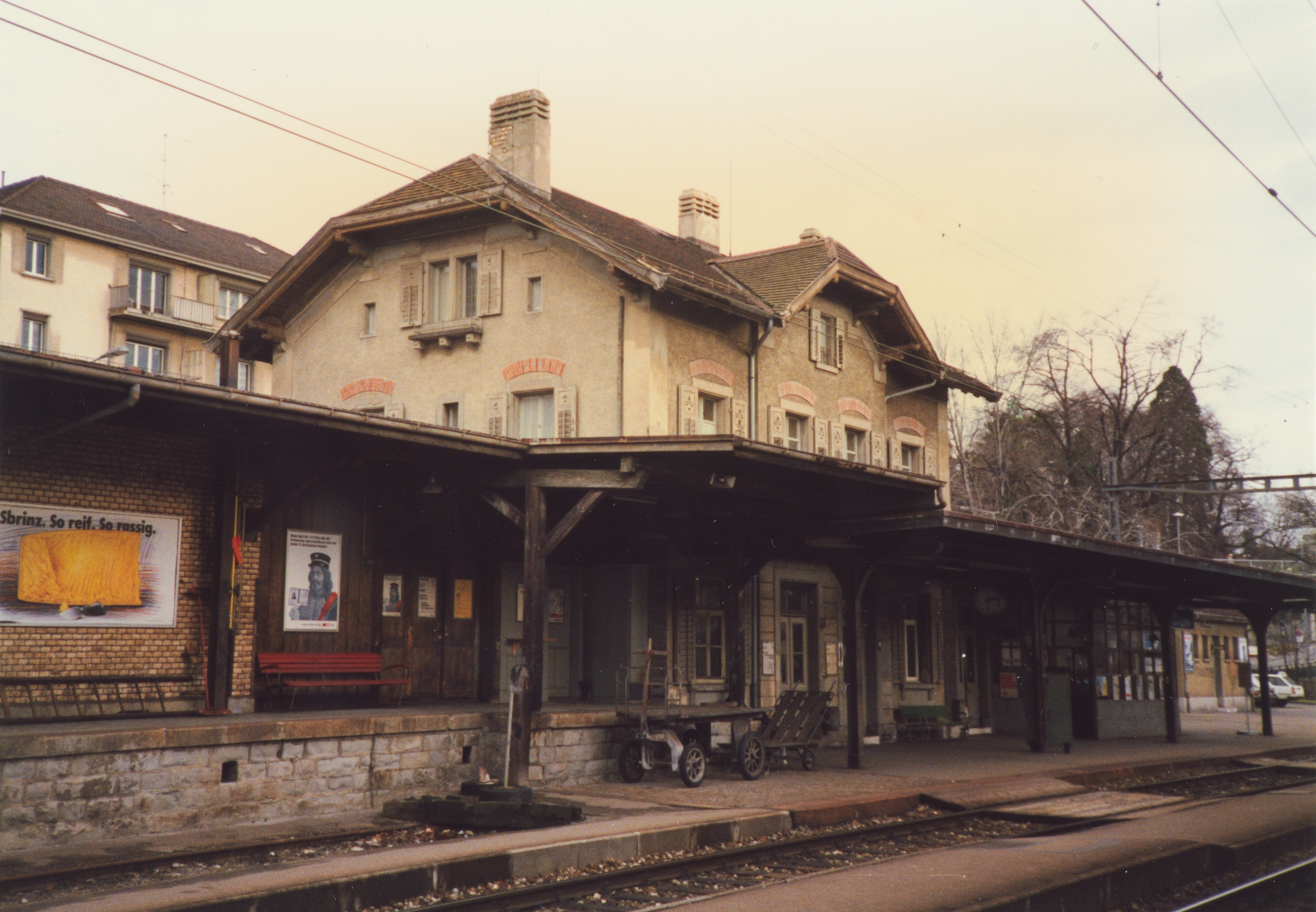
Station building with railway tracks in 1989

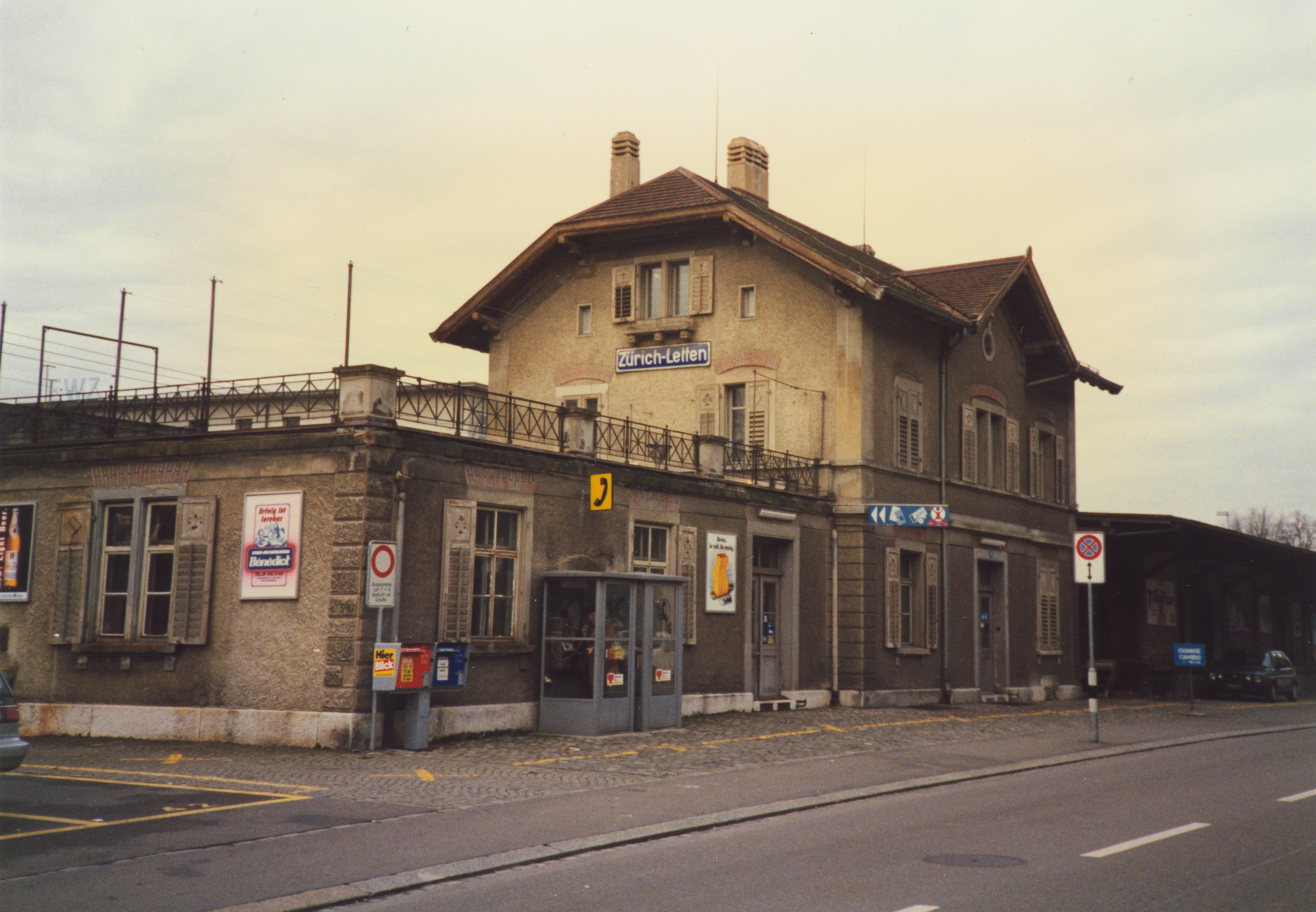
Street front of the station building (1989)

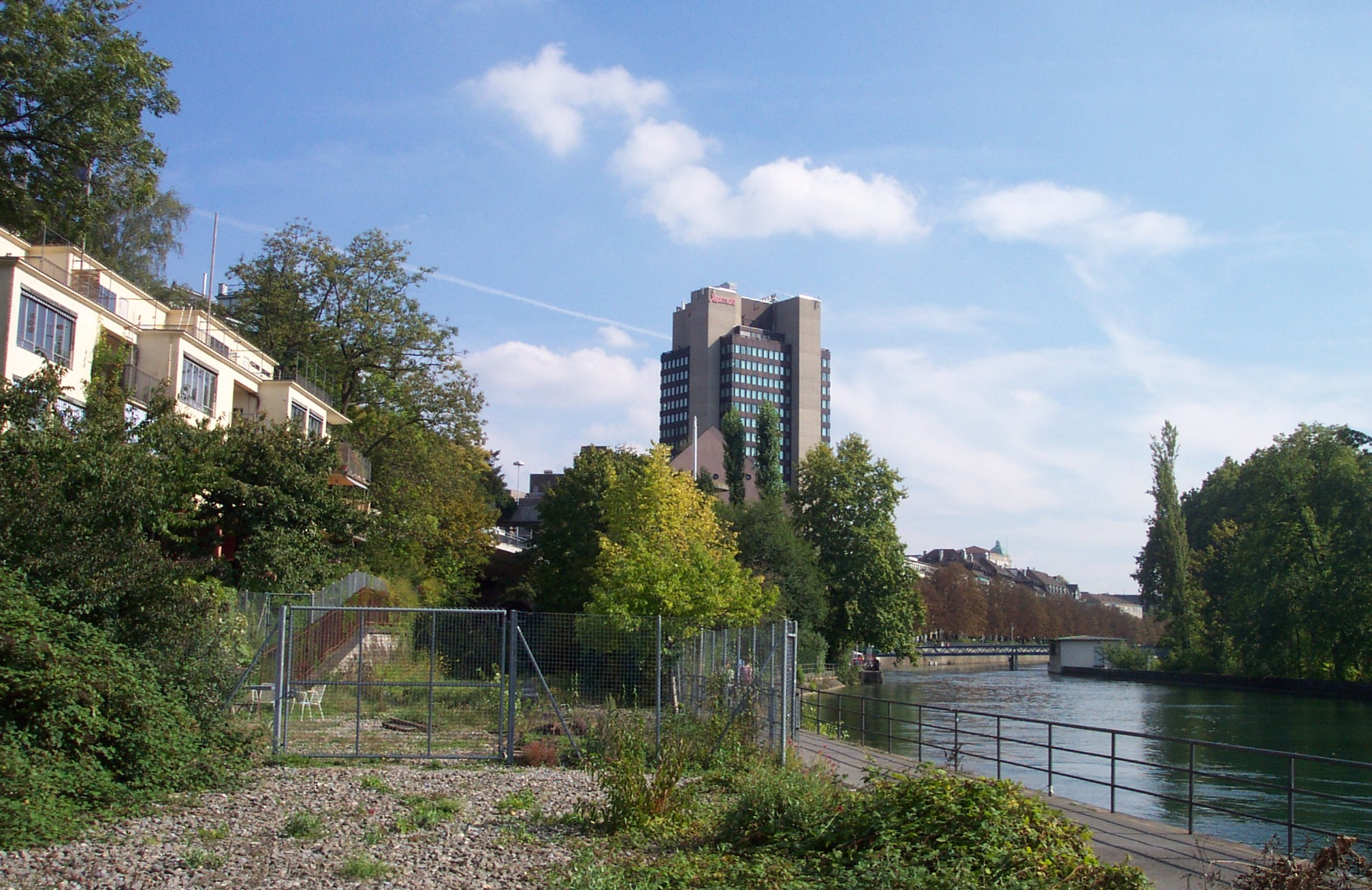
Northern entrance of the Lettentunnel

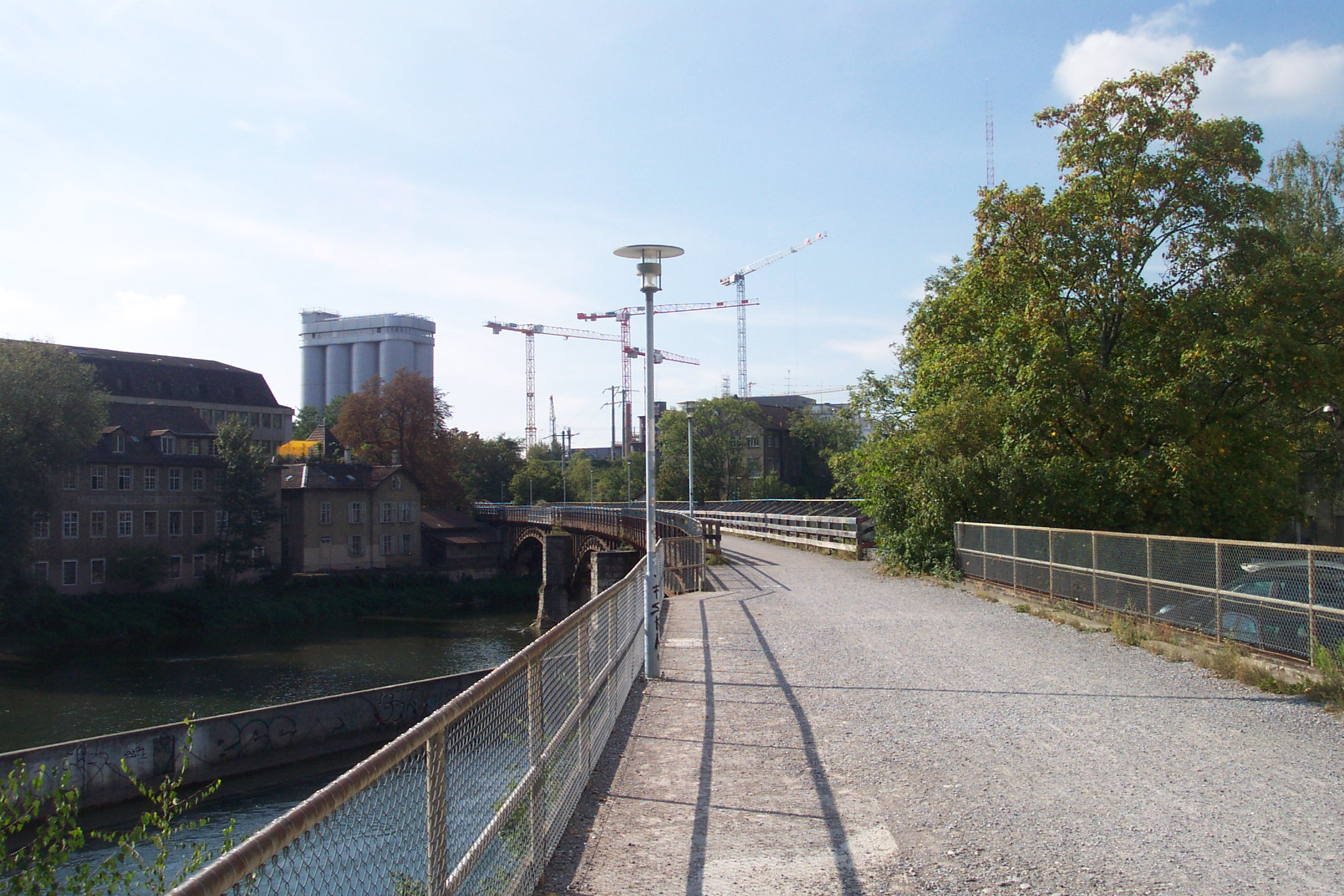
Viaduct over the Limmat viewed from the station site (now pedestrian/bicycle bridge)

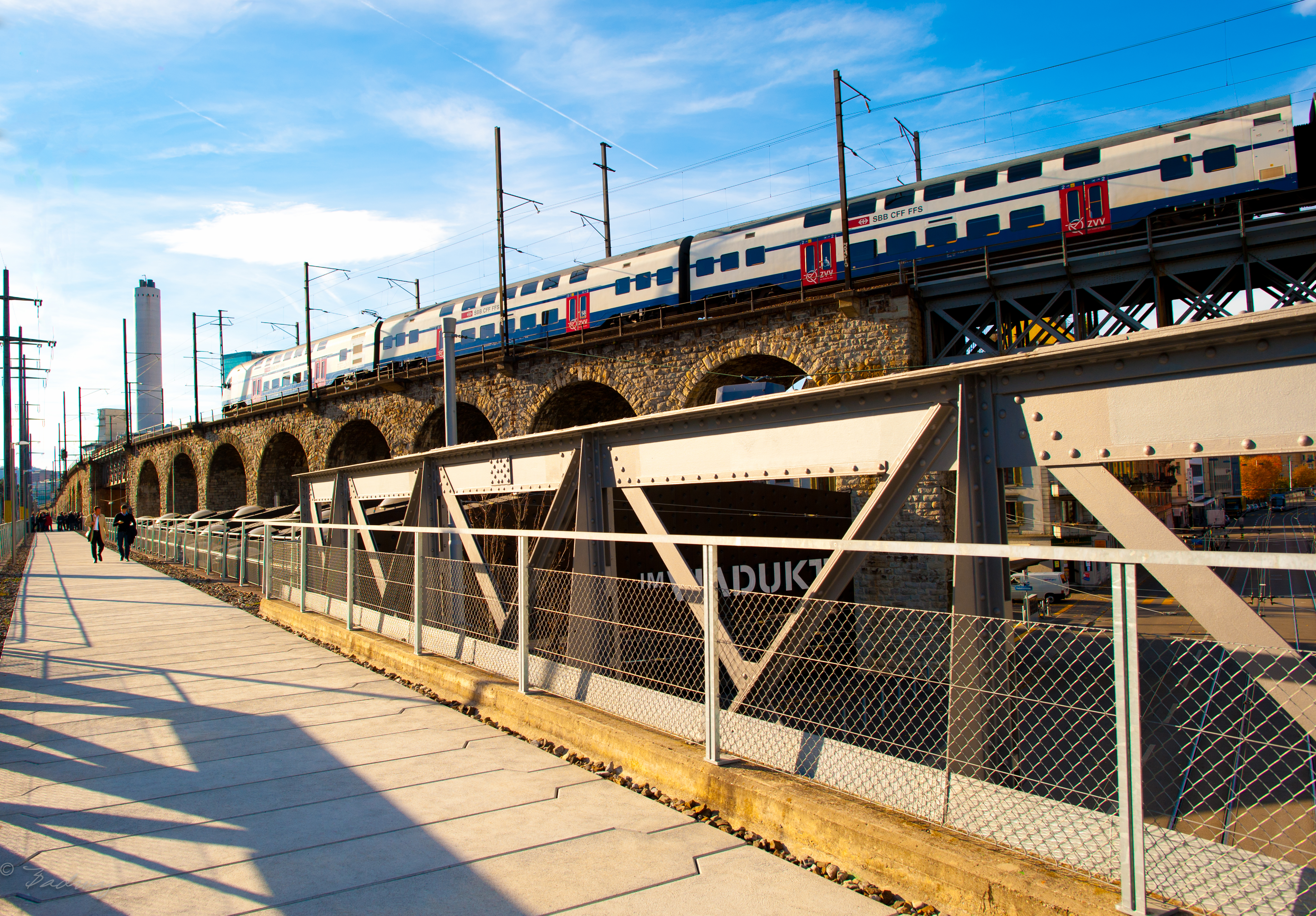
Aussersihl Viadukt: Line to Wipkingen and Oerlikon above, the line to Letten (below) was repurposed as a bridge for pedestrians and cyclists

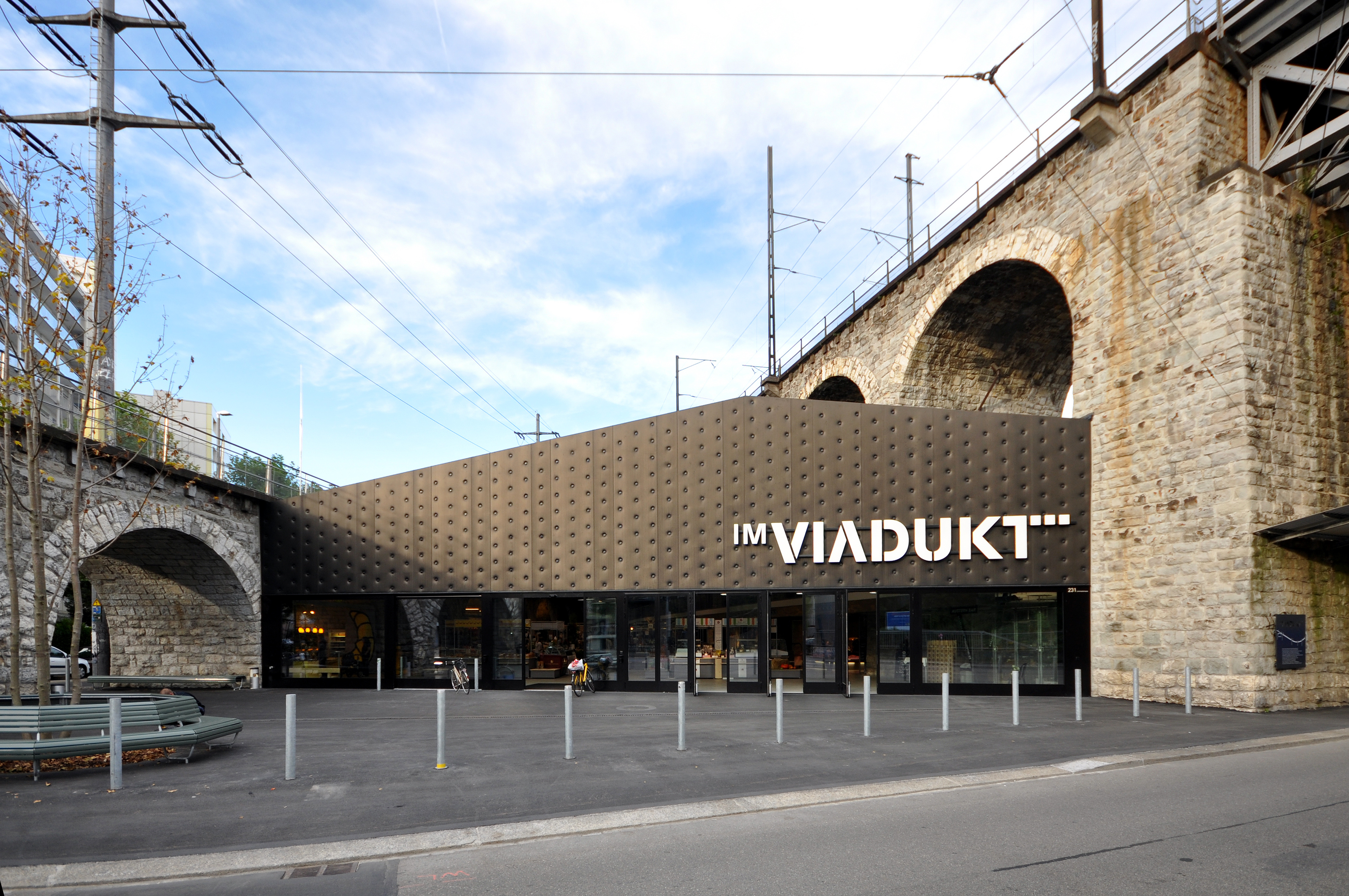
Markthalle im Viadukt market where the line to Letten (left) diverges from the line to Wipkingen (right)

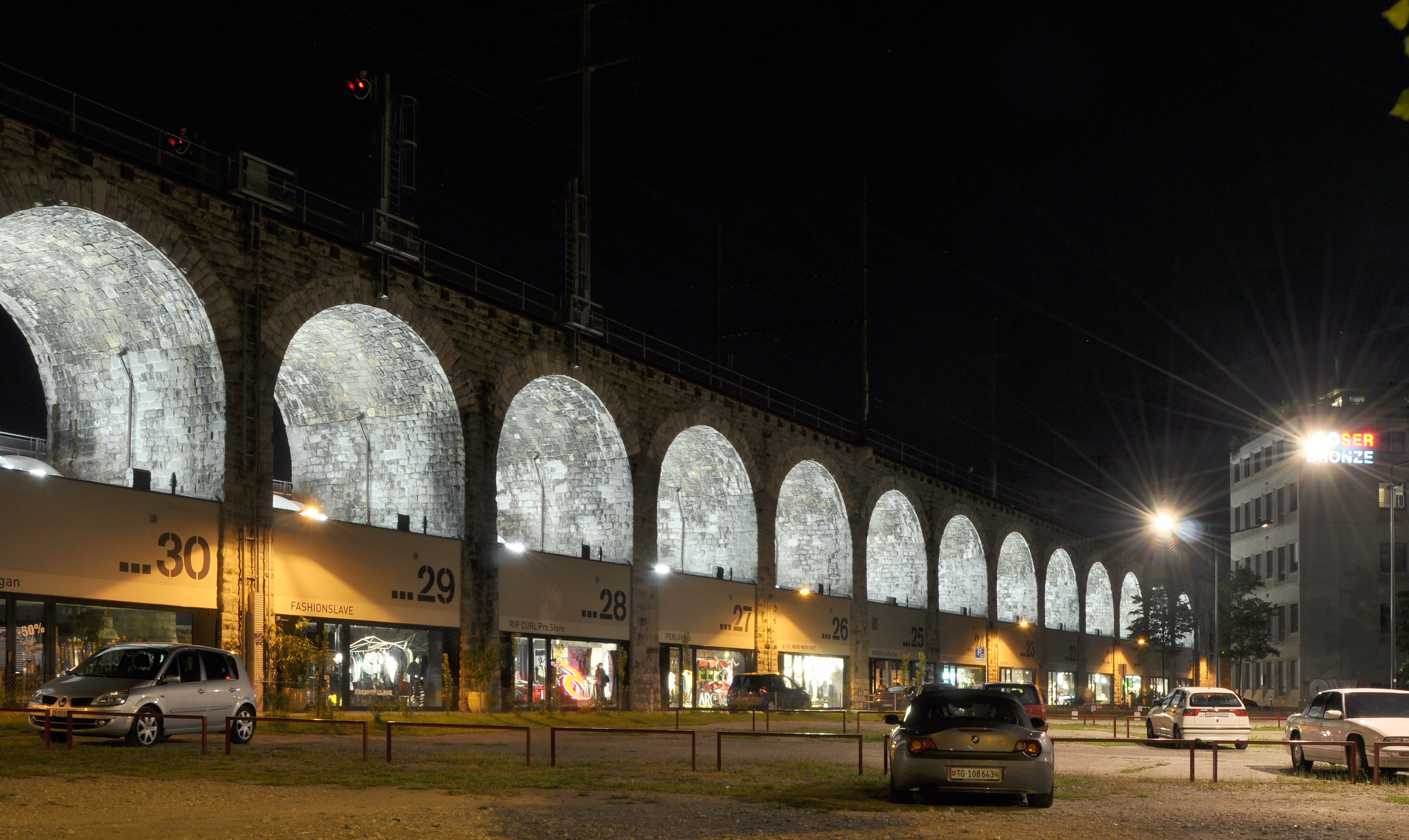
Illuminated arches of the Aussersihl Viadukt with shops (Im Viadukt)

== See also ==
- List of railway stations in Zurich
