= Zürich Wipkingen railway station =

Railway station in the Wipkingen quarter of the Swiss city of Zurich

Zürich Wipkingen
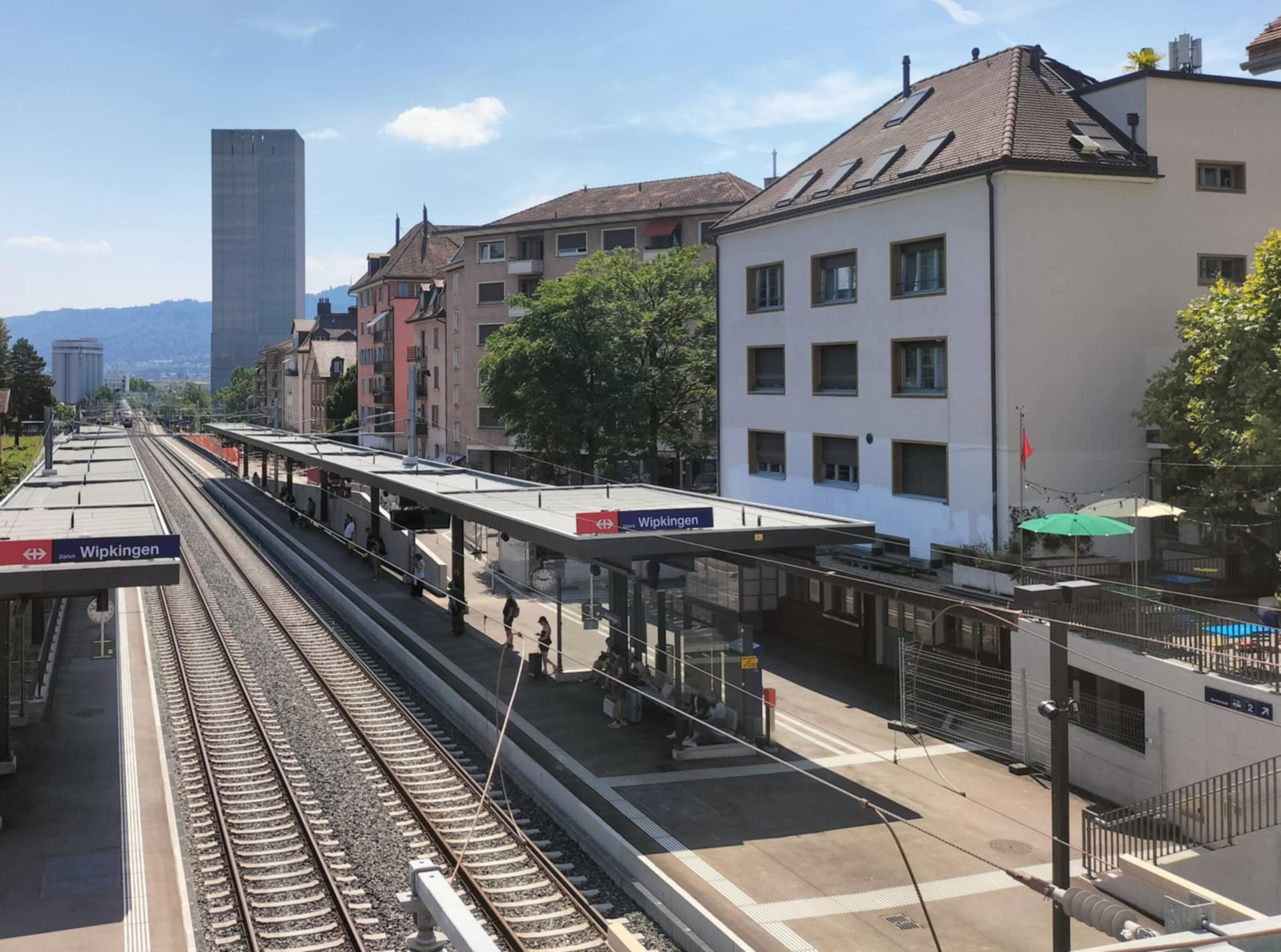
- Station building and platforms (Swissmill Tower in the background)

General information
- Location: Wipkingen, City of Zürich, Canton of Zürich, Switzerland
- Coordinates: 47.3920°N 8.5291°E
- Elevation: 425 m (1,394 ft)
- Owner: Swiss Federal Railways
- Operator: Swiss Federal Railways
- Line: Zürich–Winterthur
- Platforms: 2 side platforms (since 2024)
- Tracks: 2
- Connections: ZVV Bhf. Wipkingen
- Bus: VBZ buses 33 46
- Airport: Direct line S24 to/from Zürich Airport in 0:08h

Construction
- Architect: Emil Schlaginhaufen (1932)

Other information
- Fare zone: ZVV 110

History
- Opened: 1932
- Rebuilt: 2024

Passengers
- 2018: 2700 per weekday

Services
Preceding station	Zurich S-Bahn	Following station
Zürich Hauptbahnhof towards Zug	S24	Zürich Oerlikon towards Thayngen or Weinfelden
Location
- Location within Switzerland

Zürich Wipkingen railway station (German: Bahnhof Zürich Wipkingen) is a railway station in the Wipkingen quarter of the Swiss city of Zurich, within fare zone 110 of the Zürcher Verkehrsverbund (ZVV). It is situated on the Zürich–Winterthur railway line, which was built by the Swiss Northeastern Railway (Schweizerische Nordostbahn).

The route towards Zürich HB leads over the Wipkingen viaduct (Wipkinger Viadukt). Immediately at the northern end of the station, the Wipkingen Tunnel starts and connects it to Zürich Oerlikon.

== Service ==
Wipkingen station is served only by S-Bahn-style regional trains. As of December 2022, the station is served half-hourly by line S24 of the Zürich S-Bahn.

- S24 Thayngen/Weinfelden–Winterthur–Zürich Flughafen –Wipkingen–Zürich HB–Thalwil–Zug
  Services stop in Kemptthal until 9:20 PM; the lines to Thayngen and Weinfelden are operated alternately at hourly intervals; stops between Neuhausen and Winterthur only in Andelfingen.

== History ==
The station lies on the oldest of several rail routes from the city center to the northern part of Zürich. Although the Zürich–Winterthur railway line opened in 1856, Wipkingen did not get its own railway station before 2 October 1932. Between 1908 and 1968, a tram (line 4) connected Escher-Wyss Platz with Röschlibachplatz adjacent to Wipkingen station. Urban transport has since been replaced by trolleybus services (lines 33 and 46).

Prior to the opening of the Weinberg Tunnel on 14 June 2014, this station was served by Zürich S-Bahn lines S2, S8 and S14. These lines now run via the new tunnel route, and the half-hourly S24 was extended from Hauptbahnhof further north in order to ensure that Wipkingen did not lose rail service.

InterCity, EuroCity or RegioExpress services to/from destinations to the north or northeast that use the surface tracks of Zürich HB (most with Zürich HB as their terminus) still use this line, but they do not call at Wipkingen station.

The station was refurbished in 2024. Its island platform was replaced by two side platforms. During the construction phase, the entire section between Zürich HB and Wipkingen was out of service between 10 December 2023 and 14 December 2024. During this time, trains of S24 service operated only between Wipkingen and Thayngen/Weinfelden and between Zürich HB and Zug.

== Gallery ==
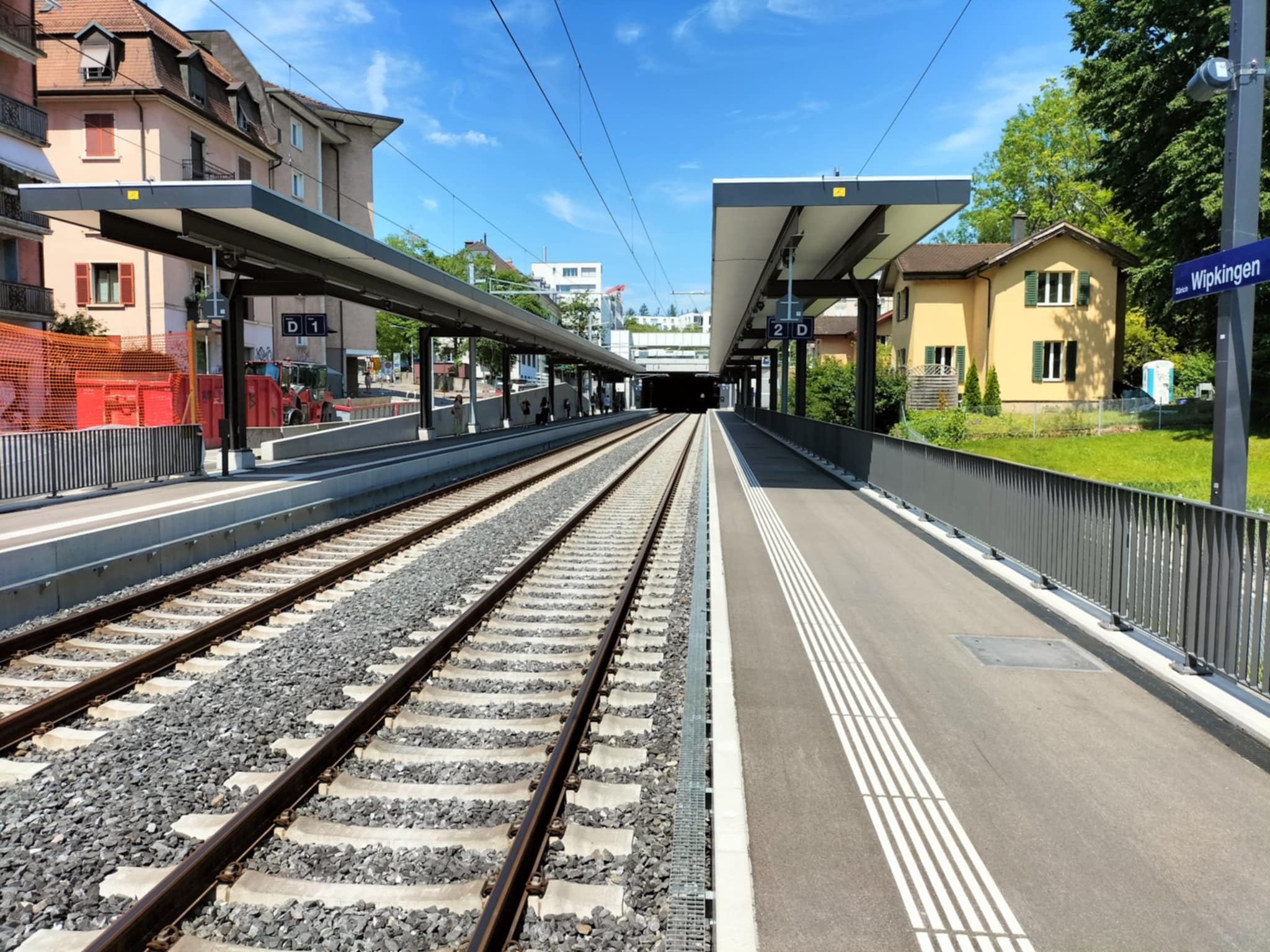
Tracks and side platforms of the refurbished station in 2025

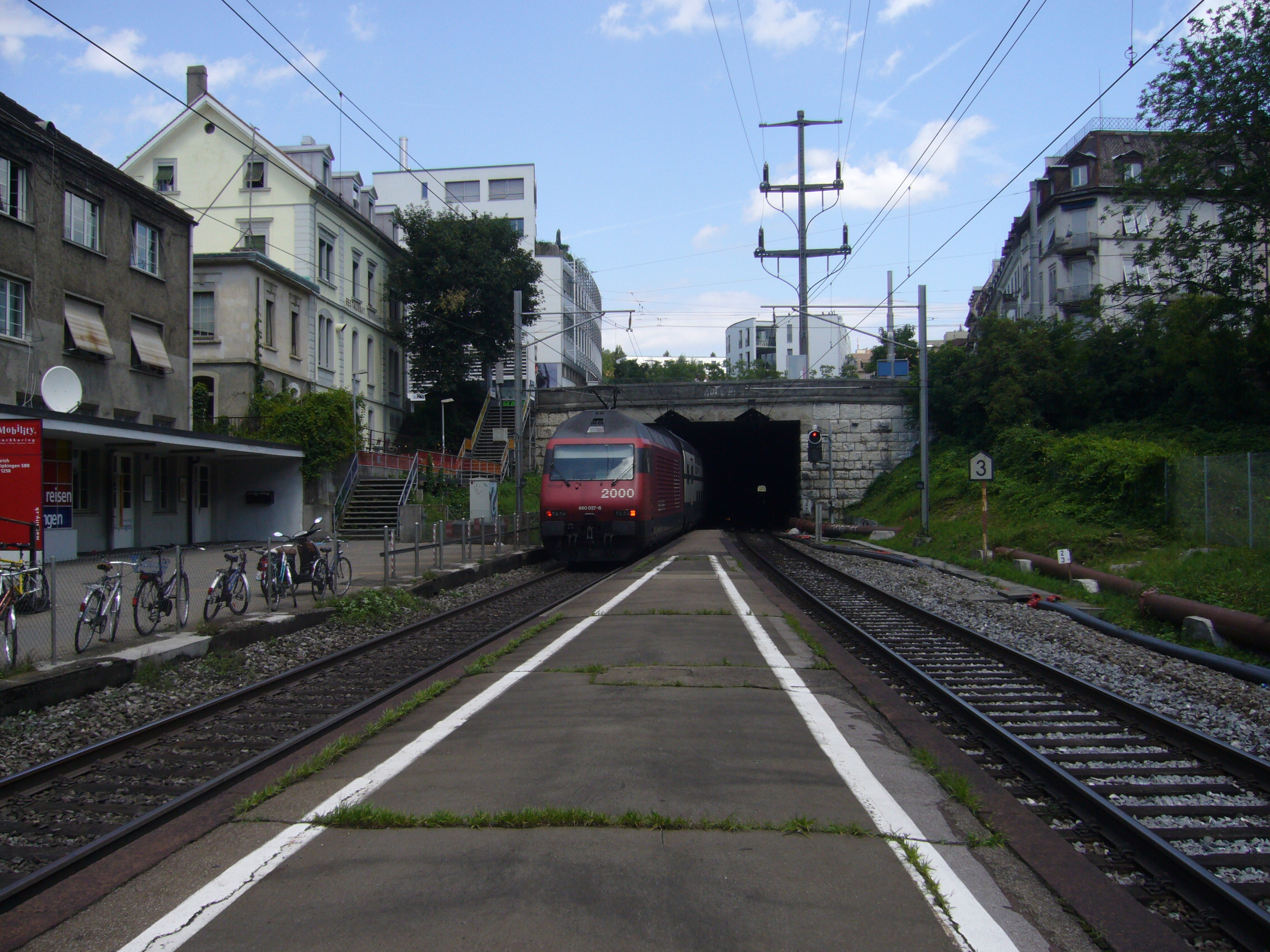
View from the former island platform towards the portal of the Wipkingen Tunnel.

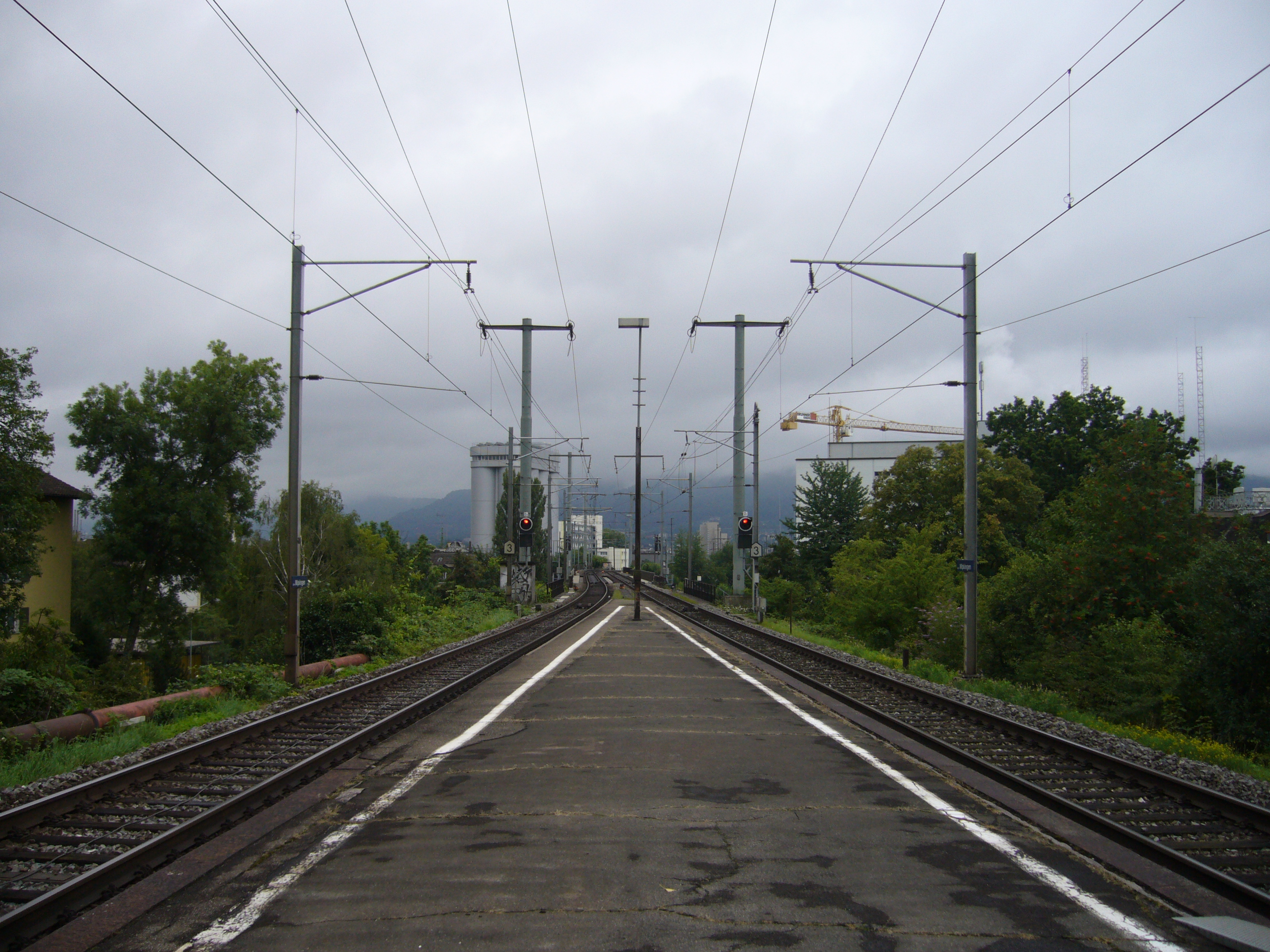
View from the former island platform towards South.

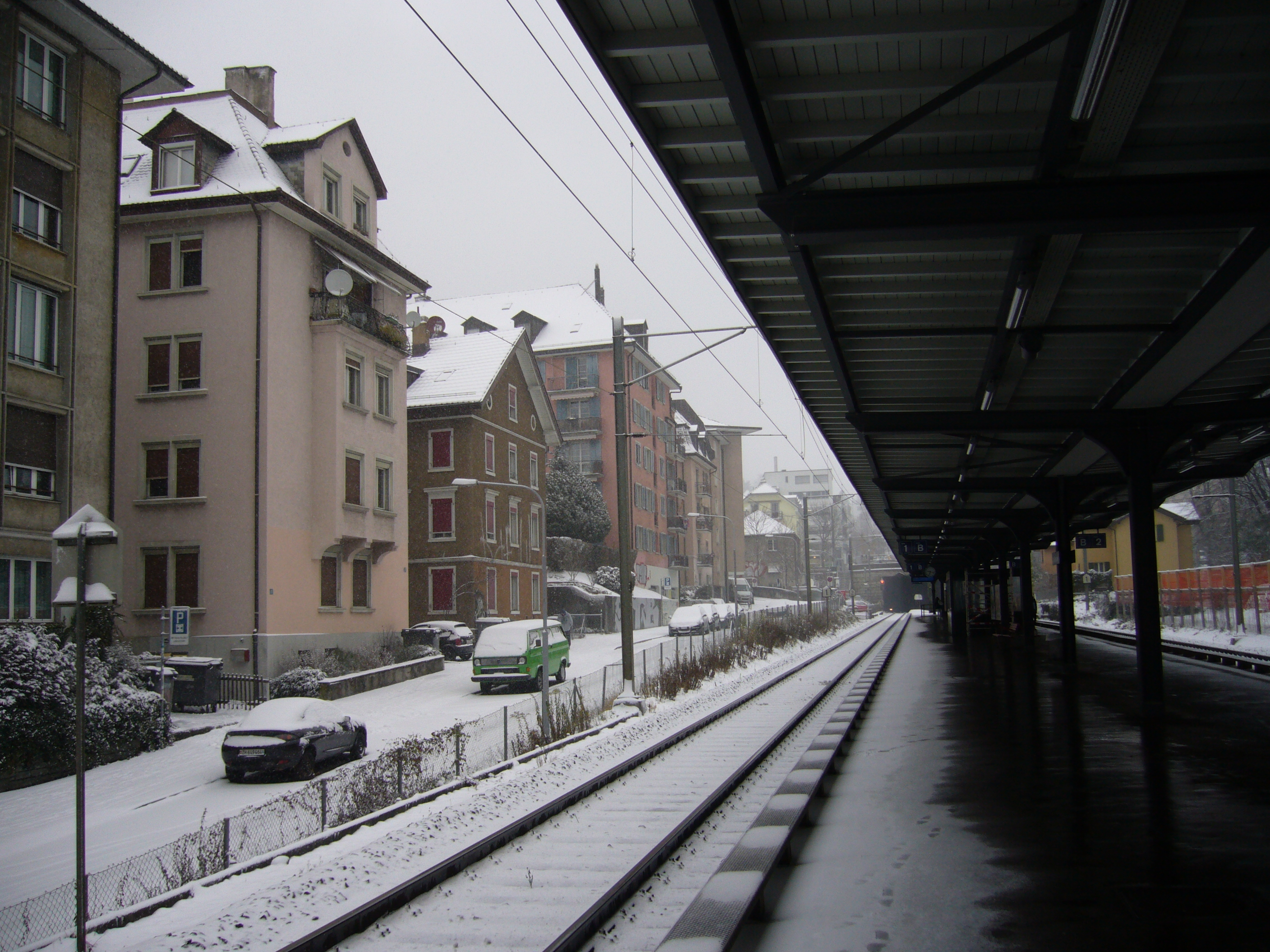
Track 1 of the station and former island platform.

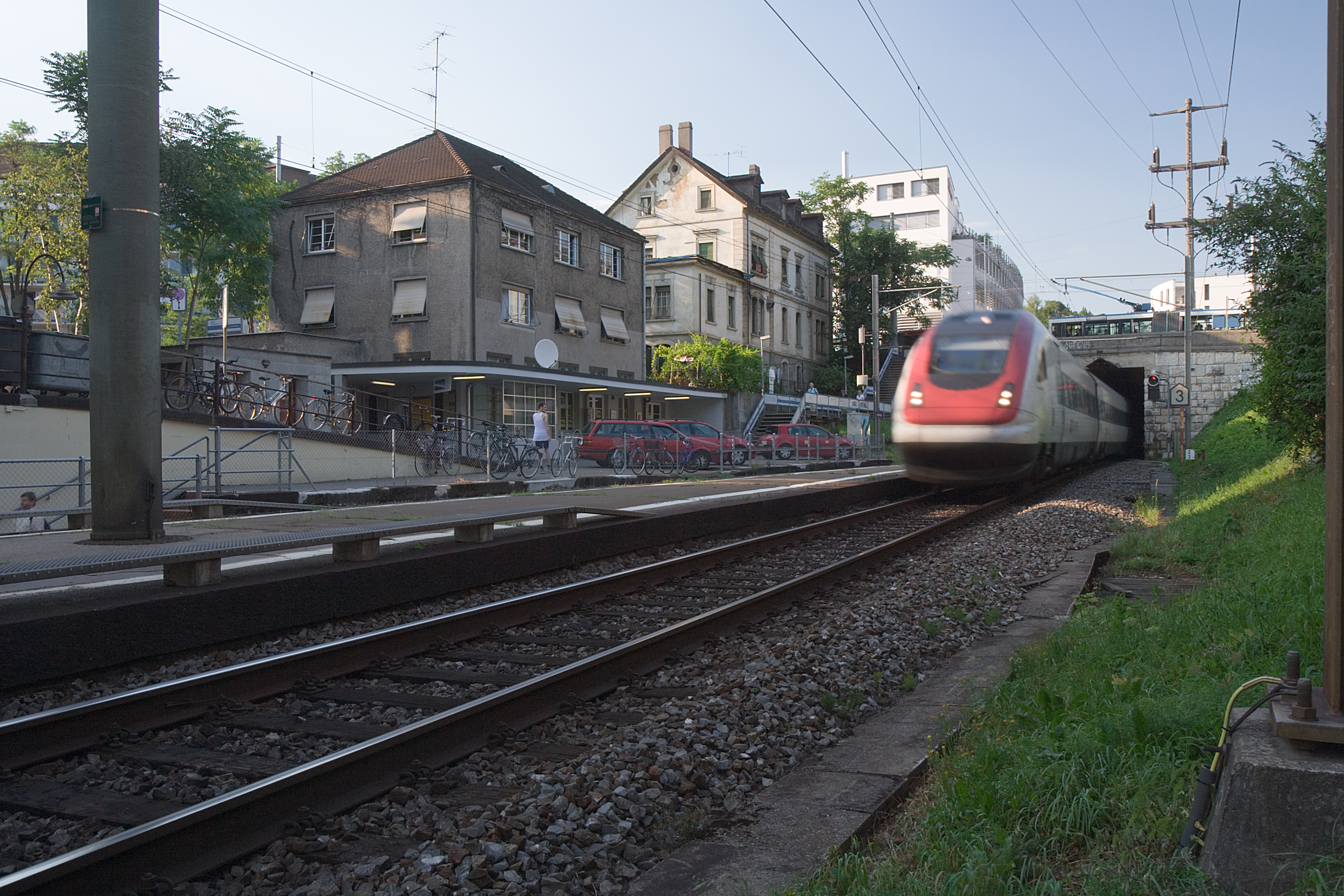
IC train of SBB emerging from the Wipkingen tunnel

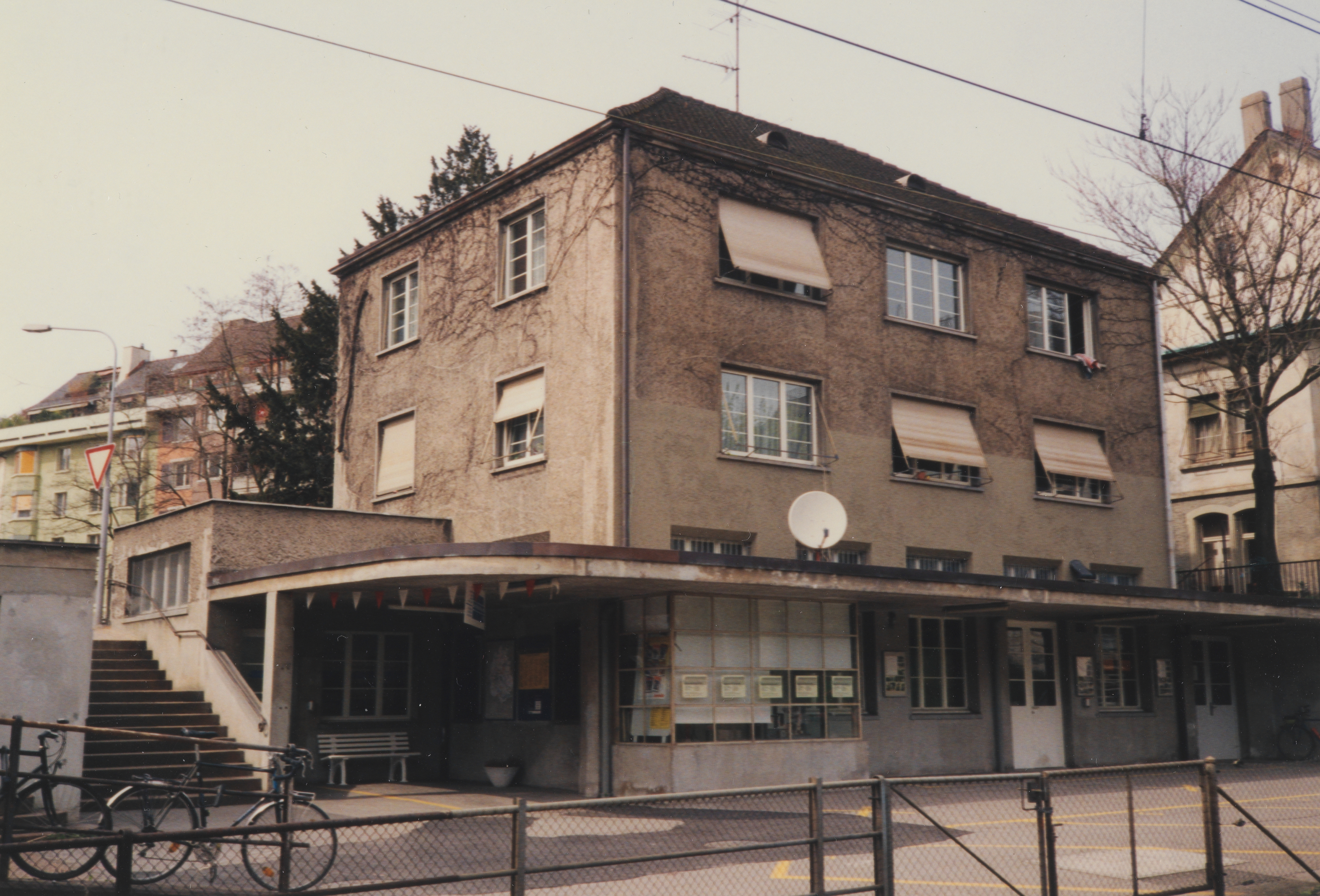
Wipkingen station building.

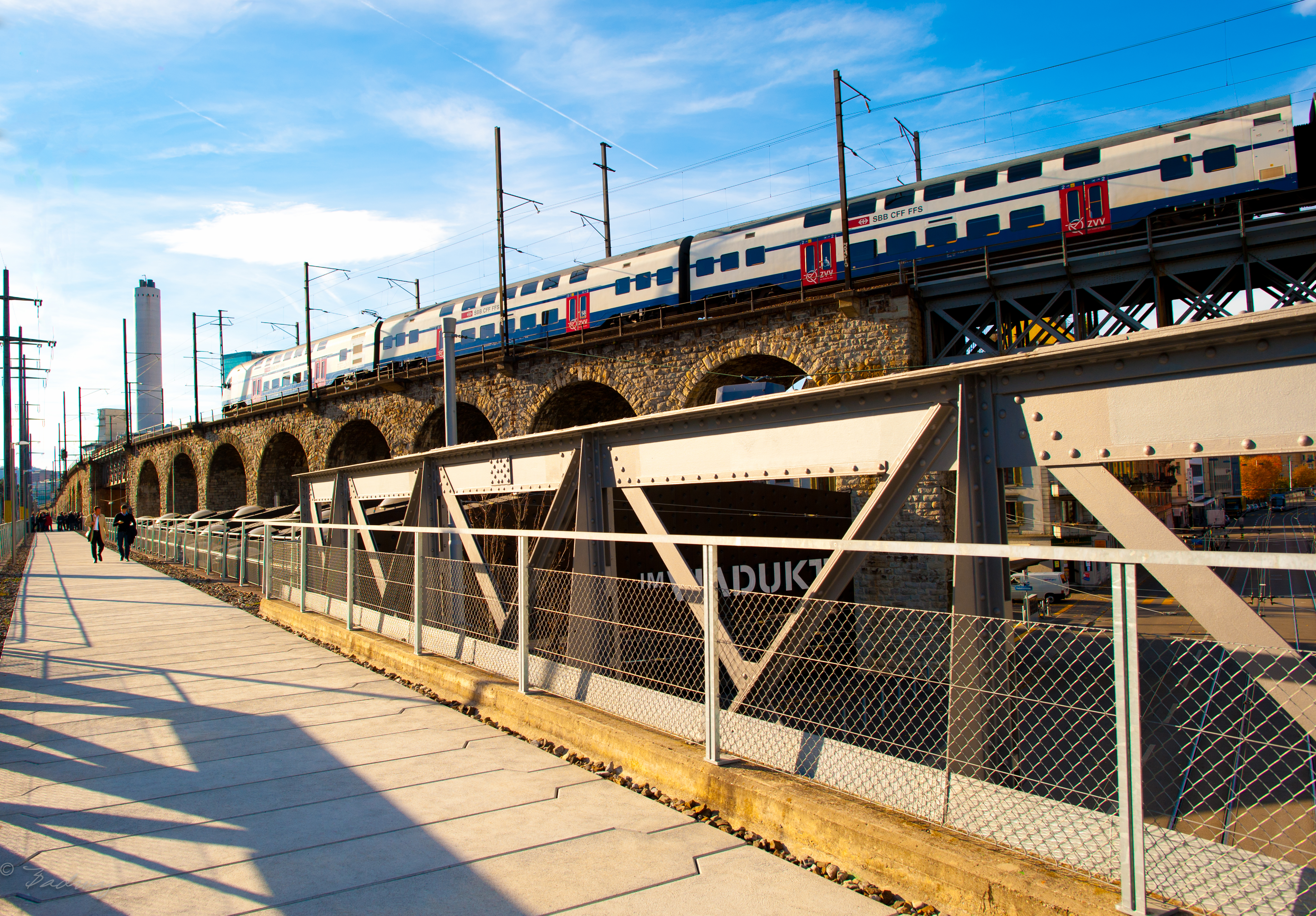
Zürich S-Bahn RABe 514 EMU on the Wipkinger Viadukt (the closed line to Letten was repurposed as a pedestrian/bicycle route).

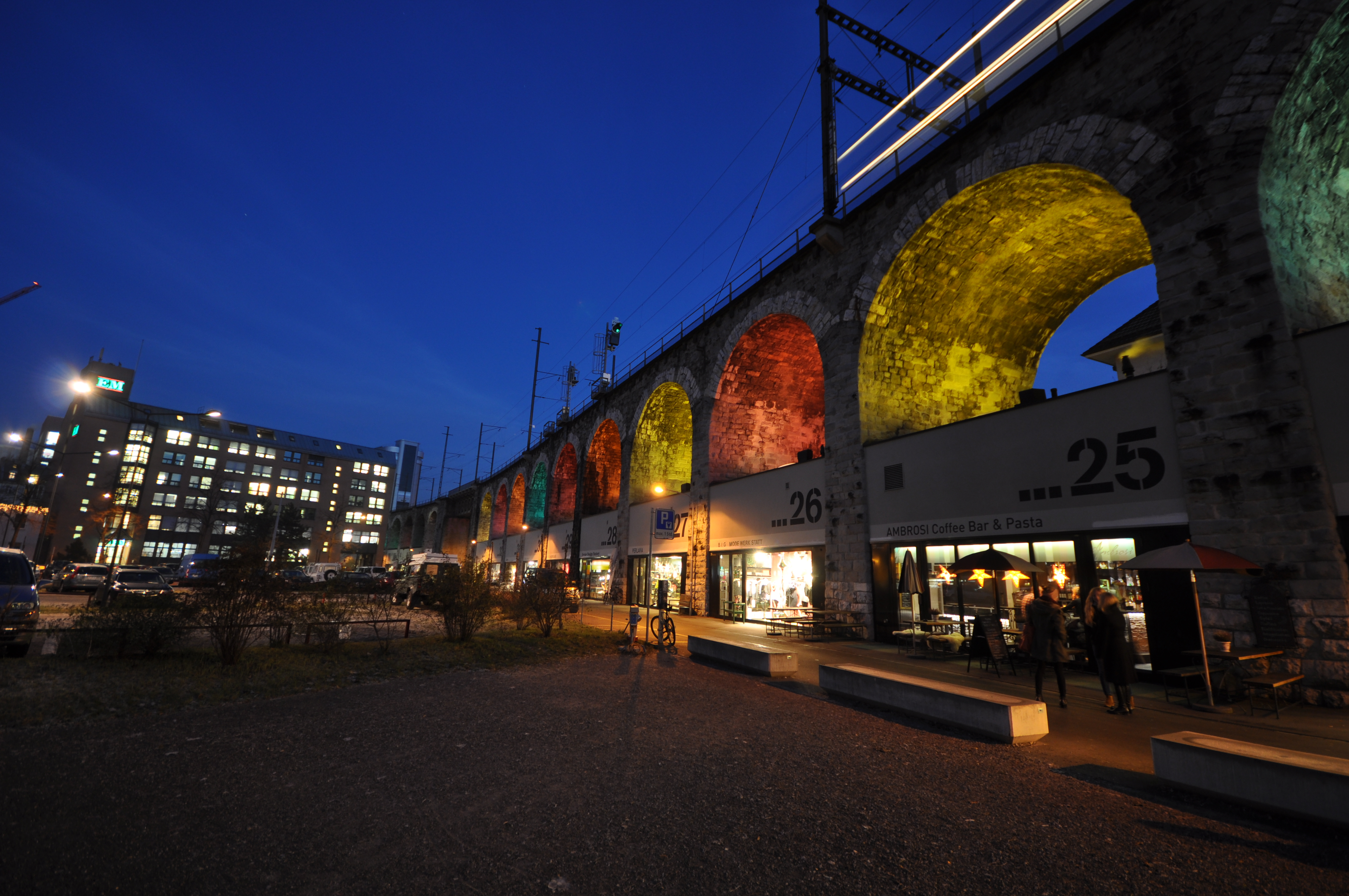
Illuminated Wipkinger Viadukt with shops (Im Viadukt).

== See also ==
- List of railway stations in Zurich
- Public transport in Zurich
- Rail transport in Switzerland
