= Zürichberg Tunnel =

Railway tunnel in Zürich, Switzerland

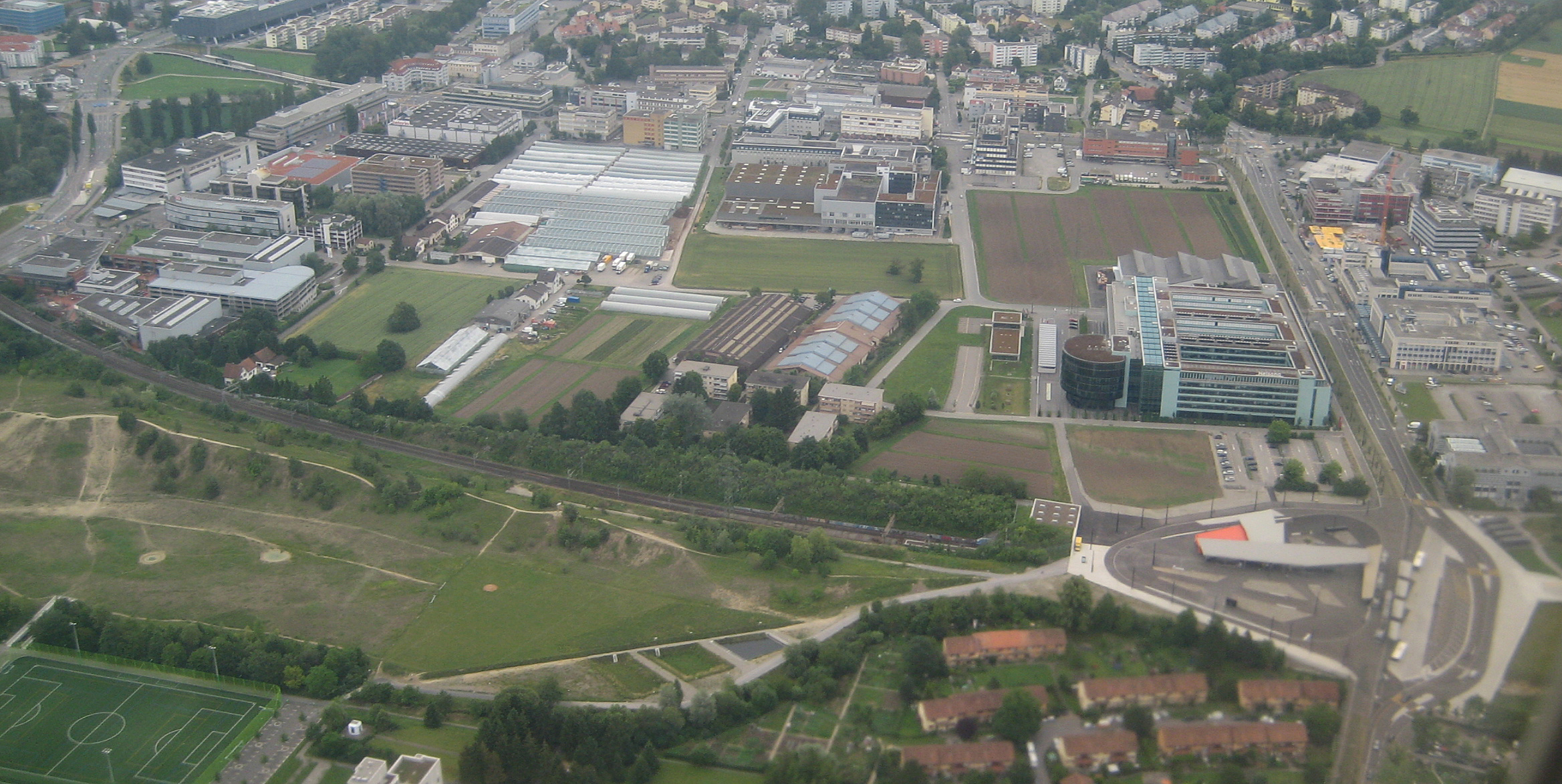
- Aerial view of the eastern portal at Stettbach station

Overview
- Line: Zürichberg
- Location: Zürich, Switzerland
- Coordinates: 47.3657128°N 8.5569026°E
- Status: Active

Operation
- Owner: Swiss Federal Railways
- Operator: Swiss Federal Railways
- Traffic: Rail
- Character: Passenger and freight

Technical
- Length: 4,968 metres (16,299 ft)
- No. of tracks: 2
- Track gauge: 1,435 mm (4 ft 8 1/2 in)
- Electrified: Overhead line 15 kV AC 16,7 Hz

Route map

The Zürichberg Tunnel (German: Zürichbergtunnel) is a railway tunnel in the Swiss city of Zürich. The tunnel runs from a junction with the Lake Zürich right bank line at Zürich Stadelhofen station, to Stettbach railway station. It passes under the Zürichberg range of hills that separates Zürich city centre from the Glattal region. The tunnel incorporated a set of underground platforms at Stettbach station, and carries twin standard gauge (1,435 mm or 4 ft 8 1/2 in) tracks electrified at 15 kV AC 16,7 Hz using overhead line.

The tunnel is principally used by suburban trains of the Zürich S-Bahn, but occasional use is also made by postal trains, freight trains, and long-distance passenger trains.

The tunnel was opened in 1990 as part of a program of major changes to the railway geography of this part of Zürich. Prior to these changes, Zürich Hauptbahnhof was a west-facing terminal station that required through trains to reverse in its platforms. Trains to and from the Lake Zürich right bank line had to traverse a 5 km (3.1 mi) long 270° curve to reach Stadelhofen station, whilst trains to and from the north and east were forced to use a rather indirect route through Zürich Oerlikon station. To improve these routings and allow the introduction of cross-city S-Bahn trains, the Hirschengraben Tunnel was constructed, taking a 2 km (1.2 mi) long direct route from new low-level platforms at Hauptbahnhof to Stadelhofen. At the same time the Zürichberg Tunnel was constructed from Stadelhofen to Stettbach, where a new station was constructed. To the east of Stettbach new links were constructed, linking to the Zürich to Winterthur line at Dietlikon station, and to the Wallisellen to Rapperswil line at Dübendorf station, thus allowing trains to take a direct route to and from the east and north of Zürich.

In 2014, the routing via Hirschengraben and Zürichberg tunnels was supplemented by the Weinberg Tunnel, which links a further set of low-level platforms at Hauptbahnhof via an eastbound route to Oerlikon station, as part of the Durchmesserlinie Zürich. Unlike its 1990 equivalent, this routing is intended for use by long distance passenger trains as well as the S-Bahn.
