= Lake Zürich right-bank railway line =

Railway in the Swiss canton of Zurich

Lake Zürich right-bank
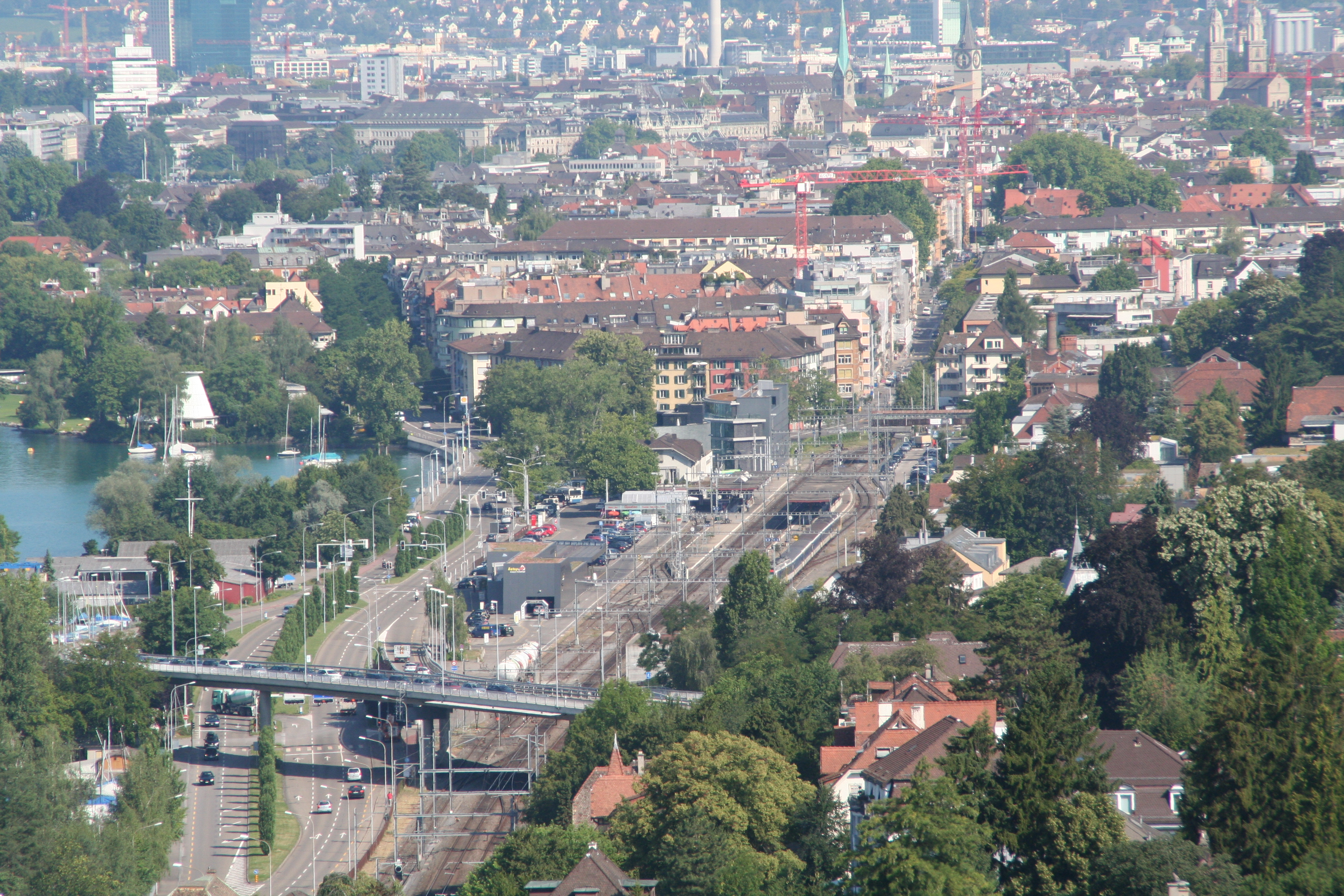
- The right-bank line at Tiefenbrunnen

Overview
- Native name: Rechtsufrige Zürichseebahn
- Owner: Swiss Federal Railways
- Line number: 730

Technical
- Line length: 31.90 km (19.82 mi)
- Track gauge: 1,435 mm (4 ft 8 1/2 in) standard gauge
- Electrification: 15 kV 16.7 Hz AC overhead catenary
- Maximum incline: 1.7%

The Lake Zürich right-bank railway line (German: Rechtsufrige Zürichseebahn) is a railway line in the Swiss canton of Zürich. As its name suggests, it runs down the right, or east, bank of Lake Zürich, connecting Zürich to Rapperswil.

The line was opened in 1894, nineteen years after the complementary left bank railway. As built, it originally departed from the surface level of Zürich Hauptbahnhof station in a westerly direction, before performing a clockwise 270 degrees turn via a viaduct over the River Limmat and the Letten Tunnel to Stadelhofen station. Since 1990 the Letten Tunnel has been closed and replaced by the Hirschengraben Tunnel, which takes a direct easterly route under the River Limmat from new low level platforms at Hauptbahnhof.

At the same time as the Hirschengraben tunnel was constructed, the Zürichberg tunnel was constructed in order to link Stadelhofen station with the Zürich to Winterthur and Wallisellen to Rapperswil via Uster lines. As a consequence the section of the right bank line between Zürich Hbf and Stadelhofen is now part of the backbone of the Zürich S-Bahn, carrying no fewer than eight separate routes.

However beyond Stadelhofen the traffic reduces to three S-Bahn routes. Routes S6 and S16 stop at all stations as far as Uetikon or Meilen respectively. Route S7 runs non-stop from Stadelhofen as far as Meilen, then serves all stations to Rapperswil.

The line is 31.90 kilometres (19.82 mi) long, standard gauge and electrified at 15 kV 16.7 Hz AC supplied by overhead line. It is predominantly double-track, but with single-track sections from Stadelhofen to Tiefenbrunnen, Herrliberg-Feldmeilen to Meilen, Uetikon to Stäfa, and Uerikon to Rapperswil.

== History ==
=== Inauguration ===
On 12 March 1894 the 30.3 kilometre stretch from Stadelhofen to Rapperswil was officially approved and two days later it was ceremonially opened. On the inauguration day, 14 March, a procession with two decorated locomotives and 14 coaches left Stadelhofen at 12:20 bound for Rapperswil. The train was given a warm welcome all along the route and there were lengthy stops. Some displeasure was felt in Herrliberg because the station, now known as Herrliberg-Feldmeilen, was actually situated within the municipality of Meilen. Black flags and banners had been hung out, and in Untergrüt, a street adjacent to the railway line, the special train was greeted by two effigies. On the return journey petrol was poured over the effigies. As the train went past, burning peat was thrown onto the carriages and some windows were broken by stones. The damage amounted to 7 francs. This incident later became known as the Herrliberg Railway Riot and eight inhabitants of Herrliberg were remanded in custody, three of whom were sentenced to two months' imprisonment.

The following day, 15 March 1894, the regular timetabled service between Stadelhofen and Rapperswil began. There were eight trains in each direction with a journey time of 67 to 75 minutes. It was not until six months later on 1 October 1894 that the through service from Rapperswil to Zurich Central Station was introduced. The route was via the Letten Tunnel and then onto a viaduct parallel to the Zurich-Winterthur line. In 1902 the Swiss Northeastern Railway was taken over by Swiss Federal Railways.

=== Accidents ===
On 18 January 1971 two Gold Coast Express trains RABDe 12/12 1109 and 1119 collided in Herrliberg-Feldmeilen station. The cause was a combination of a points failure and human error. Six people died and 17 were injured in the accident.

On 25 March 1971 RABDe 12/12 1113 and 1117 collided on departure from Uerikon, when a driver overran a red starter signal. The collision resulted in 16 injuries.
