= Hirschengraben Tunnel =

Railway tunnel in Zürich, Switzerland

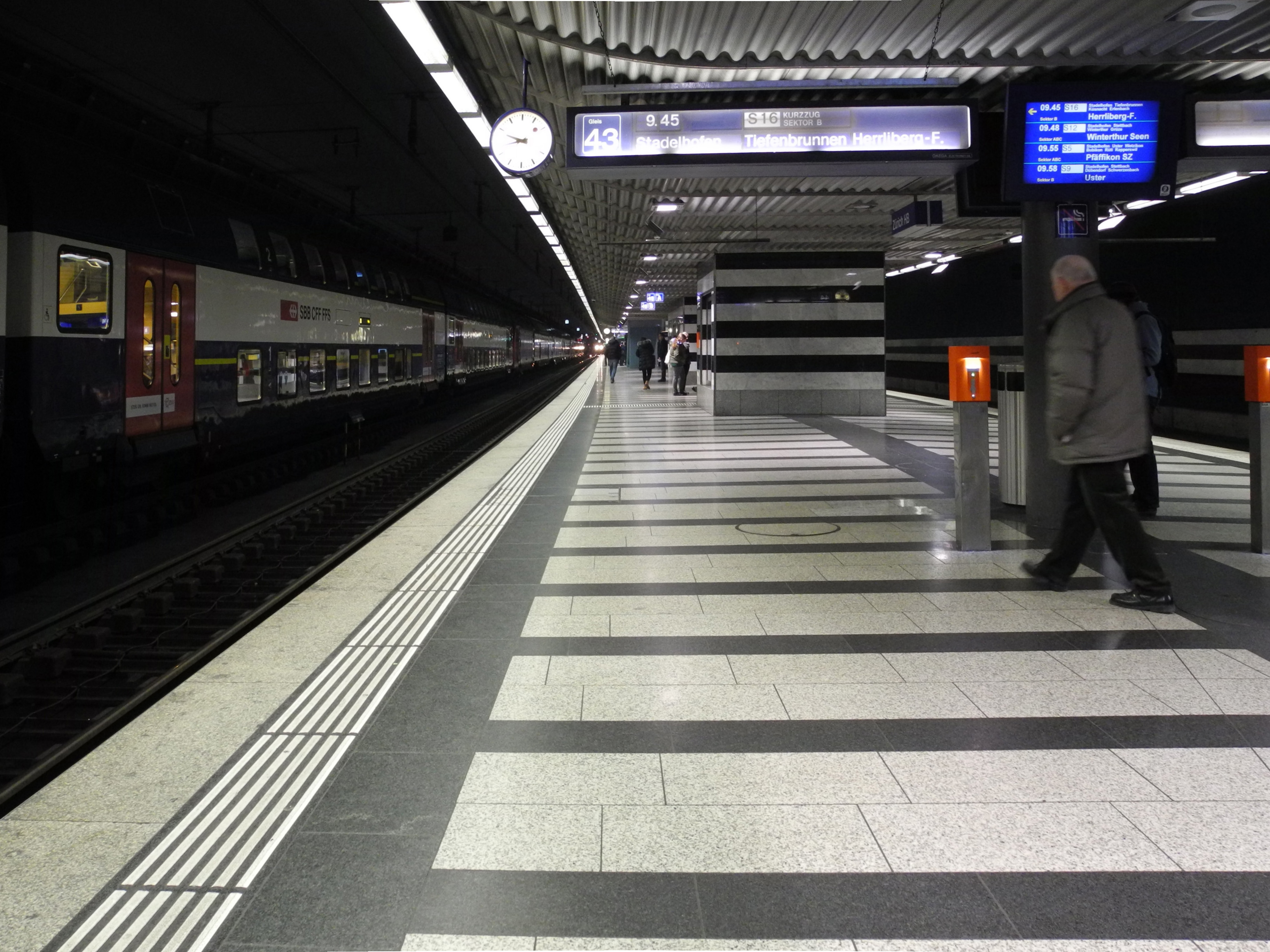
- Museumstrasse platforms

Overview
- Line: Lake Zürich right bank Zürichberg
- Location: Zürich, Switzerland
- Coordinates: 47°22′26.3″N 8°32′51.3″E
- Status: Active

Operation
- Owner: Swiss Federal Railways
- Operator: Swiss Federal Railways
- Traffic: Rail
- Character: Passenger and freight

Technical
- Length: 2,148 metres (7,047 ft)
- No. of tracks: 2
- Track gauge: 1,435 mm (4 ft 8 1/2 in)
- Electrified: Overhead catenary 15 kV AC 16,7 Hz

Route map

The Hirschengraben Tunnel is a railway tunnel in the Swiss city of Zürich. The tunnel runs from the western approaches to Zürich Hauptbahnhof railway station, east under the station, the river Limmat and city centre before turning south and surfacing at Zürich Stadelhofen station. It includes a set of underground platforms at Zürich Hauptbahnhof, and carries twin standard gauge (1,435 mm or 4 ft 8 1/2 in) tracks electrified at 15 kV AC 16,7 Hz using overhead catenary.

The tunnel was opened in 1989, and initially allowed trains to run through Zürich onto the Lake Zürich right bank line without reversal. The original routing of the right bank line, which departed from Zürich Hauptbahnhof station in a westerly direction before performing a clockwise 270 degrees turn via a viaduct over the Limmat and passing through Letten station and the Letten Tunnel to Stadelhofen, was closed after the opening of the Hirschengraben Tunnel. The following year, the Zürichberg Tunnel opened from a junction to the south of Stadelhofen to Stettbach station, thus allowing trains to run to and from points to the east and north of Zurich without reversal.

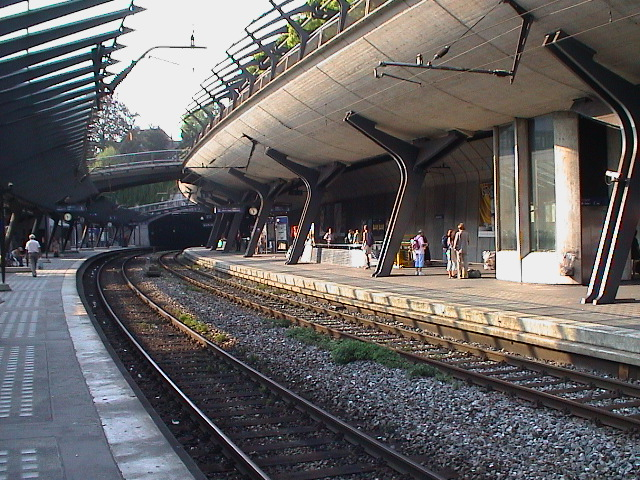
Portal at Stadelhofen station (2000)

At Zürich Hauptbahnhof, the tunnel serves a pair of underground island platforms, with four platform tracks, numbered as Hauptbahnhof tracks 41 to 44 but sometimes referred to as Museumstrasse station. These platforms are linked to the station's other platforms and facilities, both underground and surface, by a complex of subways and shopping malls.

The tunnel is principally used by suburban trains of the Zürich S-Bahn, but occasional use is also made by postal trains, freight trains, and long-distance passenger trains.

In 2014, the routing via Hirschengraben and Zürichberg tunnels was supplemented by the Weinberg Tunnel, which links a further set of low-level platforms at Hauptbahnhof via an eastbound route to Oerlikon station, as part of the Durchmesserlinie Zürich. Unlike its 1990 equivalent, this routing is intended for use by long distance passenger trains as well as the S-Bahn.

== 1991 train fire ==
On April 16, 1991, an arsonist set fire in the rear car of a train travelling the tunnel to the Stadelhofen station. It was seen by a station officer and the driver of a passing train but neither were able to reach the crew of the train on fire via radio. After the train had entered the tunnel, a passenger noted the fire and pulled the emergency brake. The driver was made aware of the fire but was unable to reach controllers via radio. He exited the train and was able to contact controllers via telephone.

The passengers, who had remained calm despite the fire, were given instructions to evacuate the train and proceed on foot to the Stadelhofen station. A second train had entered the tunnel from Stadelhofen and was stopped by a warning signal. The driver of this train decided to back his train to Stadelhofen as smoke began to fill the tunnel. The second train stopped to pick up passengers from the first train. A power outage forced the evacuation of the second train and the passengers from both trains evacuated on foot to Stadelhofen.

There were no casualties from the fire. The investigation following the fire revealed that there was inadequate lighting in the tunnel for evacuees to see a handrail on the wall meant to assist people walking out of the tunnels. It was also found that in most cases the pictograms in the tunnel were not prominent enough to be noticed and, in one case, was open to misinterpretation. The incident has been cited as a case of successful evacuation during a tunnel fire due to effective training of train crew and cooperation of passengers during an emergency.
