= Milchbuck Tunnel =

Tunnel in Zurich, Switzerland

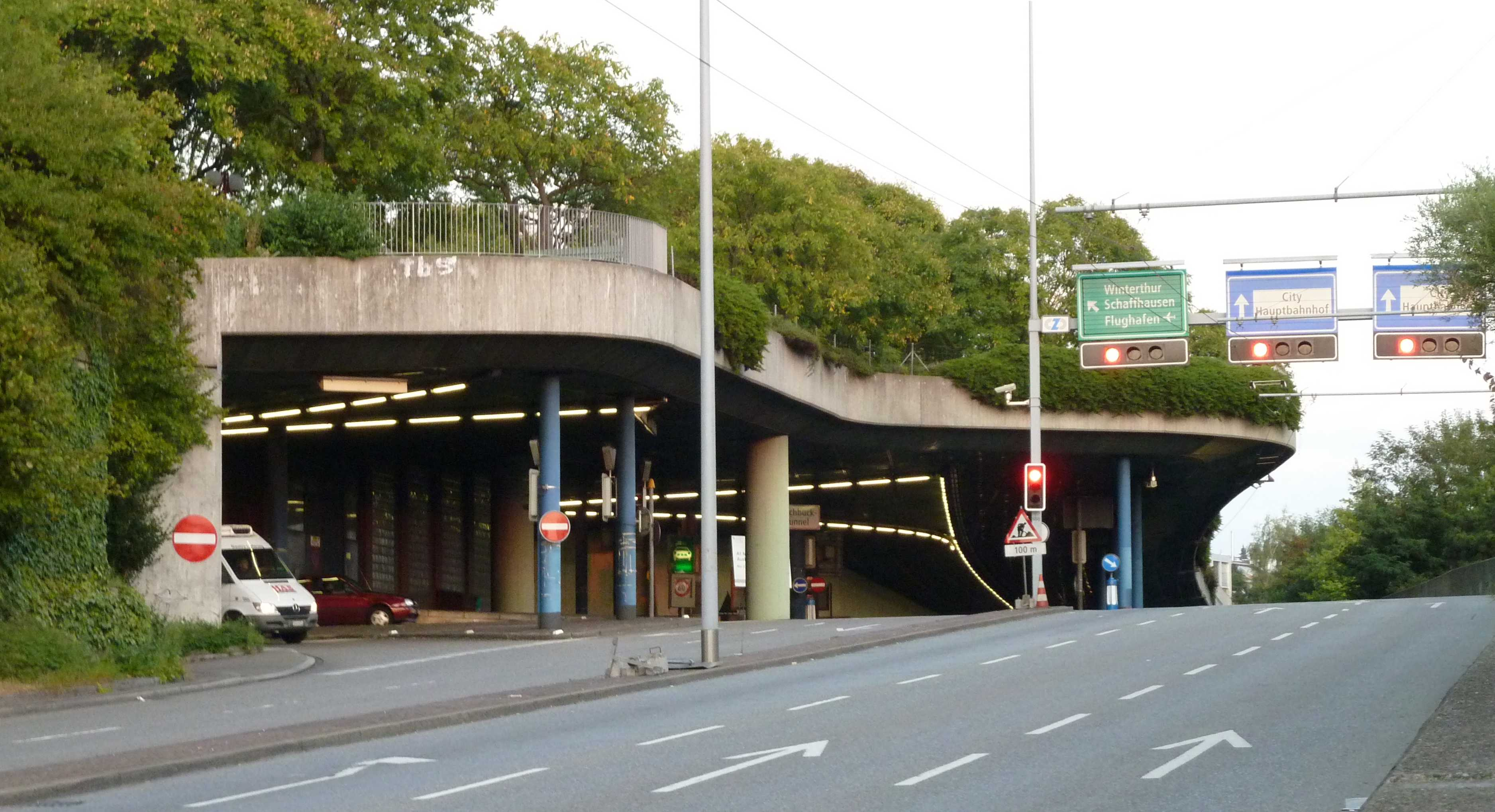
- The southern portal
- Interactive map of Milchbuck Tunnel

Overview
- Location: Zürich, Switzerland
- Coordinates: 47.3853°N 8.5369°E
- Status: Active
- Route: A1L motorway

Operation
- Opened: 1978
- Character: road

Technical
- Length: 1,910 metres (6,270 ft)

The Milchbuck Tunnel is a motor road tunnel in Switzerland, and forms part of the A1L motorway from Zürich Schwamendingen to Zürich Letten, where the tunnel's southern portal lies on Wasserwerkstrasse, which leads into central Zürich. Constructed in 1978, the tunnel is 1,910 metres (6,270 ft) in length.

A proposed second tunnel bore (to create two separate tunnels for two directions of traffic) was turned down. Now, only one lane handles traffic into downtown Zurich, one lane handles traffic leaving the city, with an emergency lane in the middle. By 2006, the emergency services in the tunnel have been upgraded, with the escape path being added. At the northern portal in the direction to the city, the entrance to the Irchel underground car park is to the left of the lane.

At about the midpoint of the Milchbuck tunnel, the Weinberg rail tunnel passes beneath it.
