= Wipkingen Tunnel =

Railway tunnel in Zürich, Switzerland

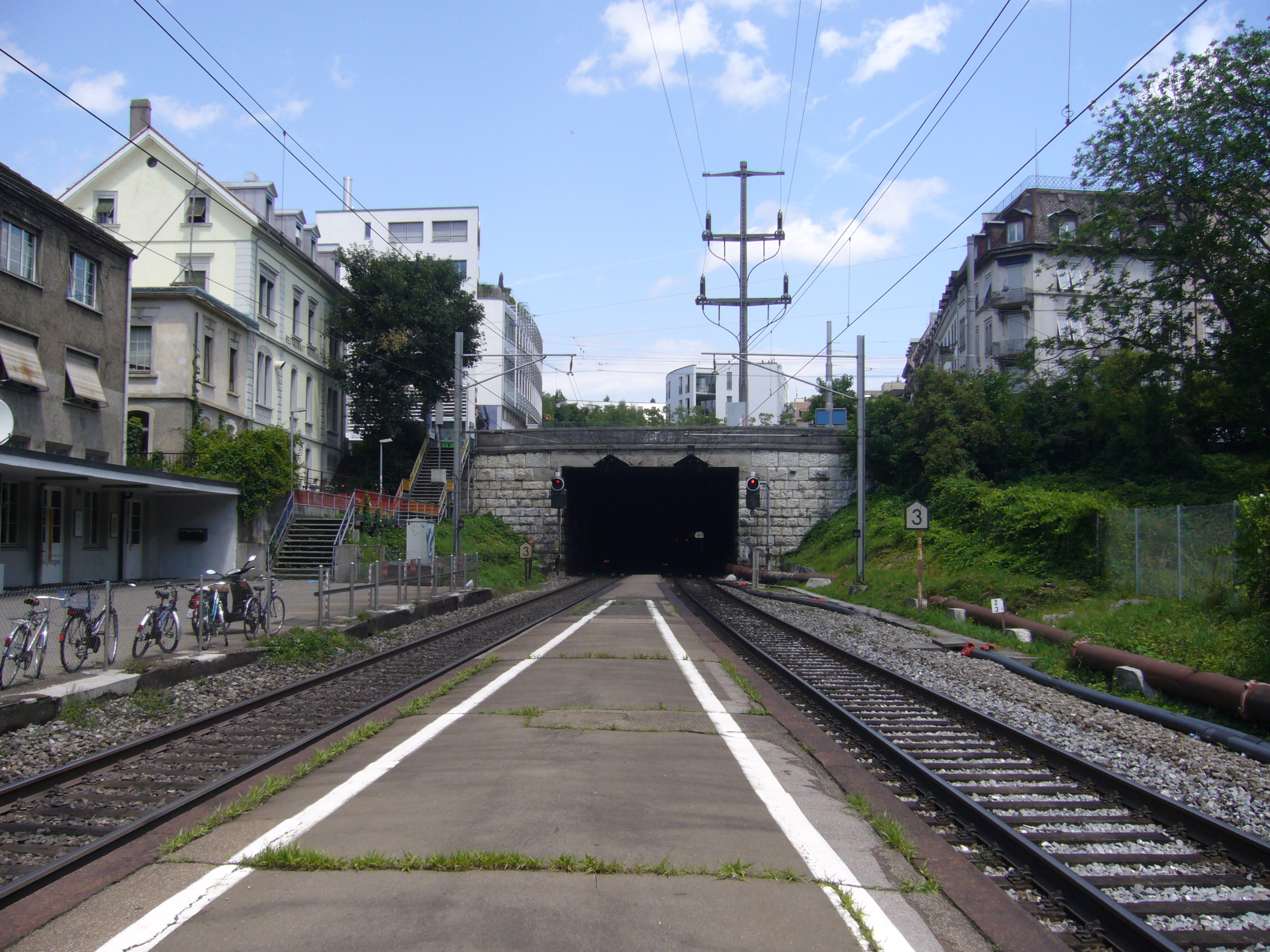
- Southern portal of the Wipkingen Tunnel, seen from Wipkingen station
- Interactive map of Wipkingen Tunnel

Overview
- Line: Zürich–Winterthur
- Location: Zürich, Switzerland
- Coordinates: 47°23′54″N 8°31′57″E
- Status: Active

Operation
- Opened: 1856
- Owner: Swiss Federal Railways
- Operator: Swiss Federal Railways
- Traffic: Rail
- Character: Passenger and freight

Technical
- Length: 959 metres (3,146 ft) (before extension); 1,200 metres (3,900 ft) (after extension)
- No. of tracks: 2
- Track gauge: 1,435 mm (4 ft 8 1/2 in)
- Electrified: Overhead catenary 15 kV AC 16 2/3 Hz

The Wipkingen Tunnel (German: Wipkingertunnel) is a railway tunnel in the Swiss city of Zürich. The tunnel runs from the northern end of Wipkingen station to a portal to the south of Oerlikon station. It carries twin standard gauge (1,435 mm or 4 ft 8 1/2 in) tracks electrified at 15 kV AC 16 2/3 Hz using overhead catenary. Since 1902, the line has been part of the Swiss Federal Railways (SBB).

The tunnel was opened in 1856 to complete the Schweizerische Nordostbahn (NOB) line from Zürich Hauptbahnhof to Winterthur via Wallisellen, which had opened from Oerlikon to Winterthur the previous year. In addition to the tunnel, a bridge, over the River Limmat, was constructed to the south of Wipkingen station, in order to access the throat of the Hautbahnhof station via a descending embankment. In the 1890s, the embankment was replaced by the Aussersihl Viaduct, which carried the Winterthur line over several streets and the railway yards and line to Baden. The footprint of the older embankment route is today occupied by Röntgenstrasse.

As built, the tunnel was 959 metres (3,146 ft) long, with a southern portal close to the Rosengartenstrasse. In the 1990s, the tunnel was extended to the south, by covering the existing railway cutting, so that the new southern portal was immediately to the north of Wipkingen station. As a result of the extension, the tunnel is now 1,200 metres (3,900 ft) in length.

The Wipkingen Tunnel is now one of three different routes from Oerlikon to Hauptbahnhof, each of which tunnels through the intermediate ridge and emerges from adjacent portals to the south of Oerlikon station. Like the Wipkingen Tunnel, the Käferberg Tunnel (opened in 1969) connects to the Hauptbahnhof's western approaches, whilst the Weinberg Tunnel (opened in 2014) accesses the Hauptbahnhof's lower level through platforms from the east.

Since the opening of the Weinberg Tunnel, use of the Wipkingen Tunnel is largely confined to long distance trains, with most Zürich S-Bahn services using either the Weinberg or Käferberg tunnels. However to ensure that Wipkingen station is still served, the half-hourly S-Bahn service S24 uses the Wipkingen Tunnel. As there is no rail access from the Wipkingen route to the Hauptbahnhof's low-level through platforms, this necessitates that the S24 reverses in the high-level terminal platforms, making it the only remaining S-Bahn service to do so.
