= Letten Tunnel =

Former railway tunnel in Zurich

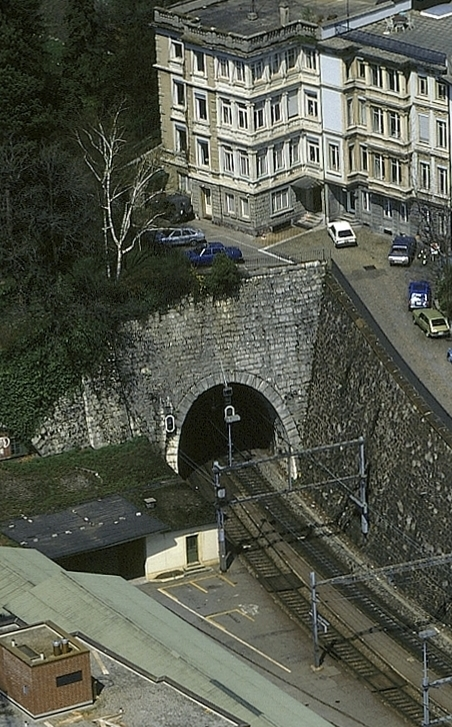
- Portal at Stadelhofen station (1983)

Overview
- Line: Lake Zurich right bank line
- Location: Zurich, Switzerland
- Coordinates: 47.3838°N 8.5388°E
- Status: Disused and filled

Operation
- Owner: Swiss Federal Railways
- Operator: Swiss Federal Railways
- Traffic: Rail
- Character: Passenger and freight

Technical
- Length: 2,093 metres (6,867 ft)
- No. of tracks: 1
- Track gauge: 1,435 mm (4 ft 8 1/2 in)
- Electrified: Overhead catenary 15 kV AC 16,7 Hz

Route map

The Letten Tunnel (German: Lettentunnel) was a railway tunnel in the Swiss city of Zurich. It formed part of the old route of the Lake Zurich right bank railway (Rechtsufrige Zürichseebahn) from Zürich Hauptbahnhof railway station to Rapperswil station. Radical changes to the local railway geography led to the tunnel being disused in 1989, tracks removed by 2002, and finally filled in from 2002-2004 due to its poor condition.

As built in 1894, the right bank railway was a single track line that departed from Hauptbahnhof in a westerly direction, before performing a clockwise 270 degrees turn via a viaduct over the Limmat, the principal river flowing through the city of Zurich. It then passed through Letten station and the Letten Tunnel in order to reach Stadelhofen station. By rail the distance between Hauptbahnhof and Stadelhofen was some 5 kilometres (3.1 mi), despite the fact that they are only 1.5 kilometres (0.93 mi) apart in a straight line.

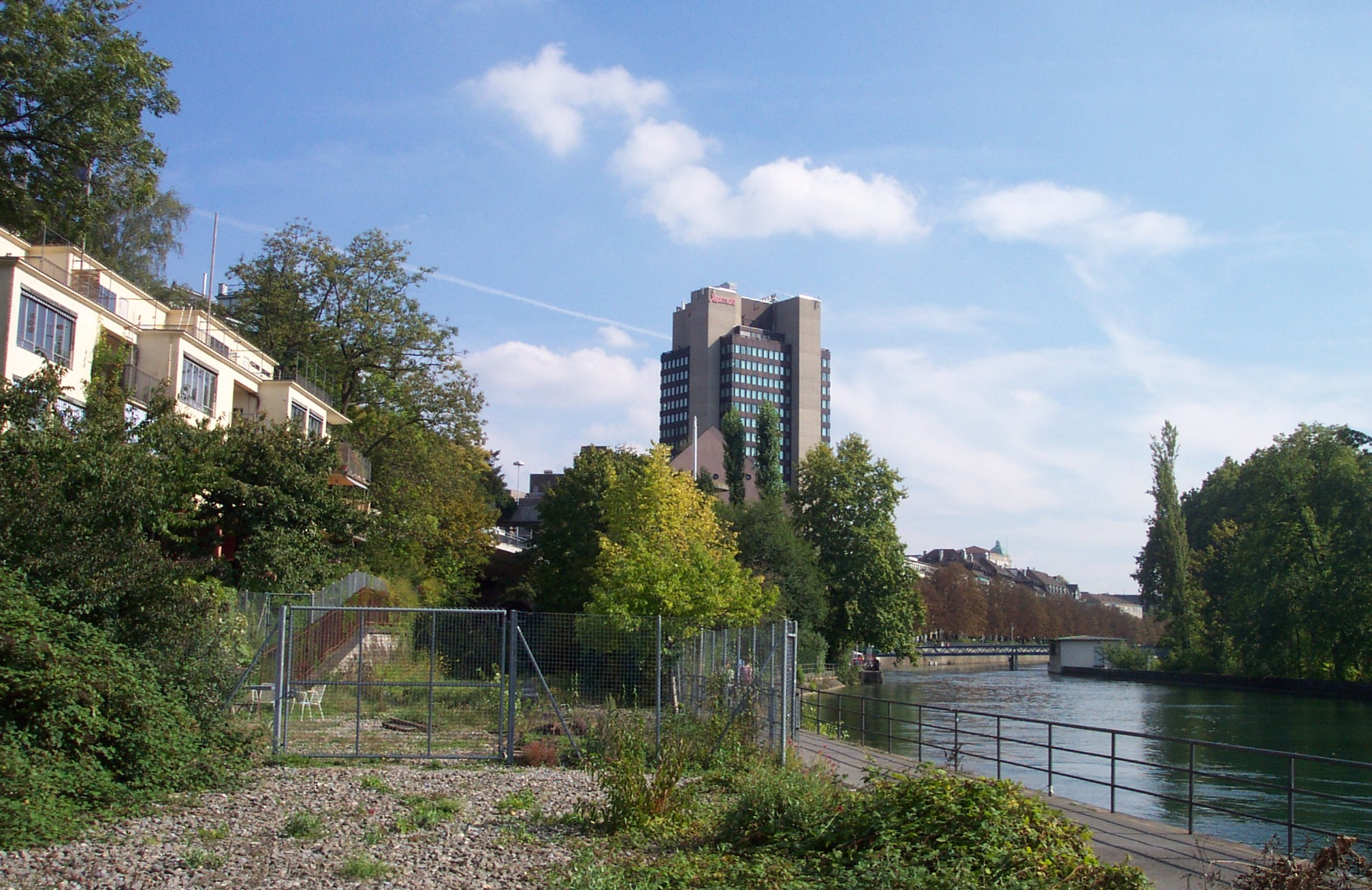
The northern portal, near the former Letten station (2011, after closure)

In 1990 the Letten Tunnel was replaced by the Hirschengraben Tunnel, which provided a direct route under the Limmat to Stadelhofen through new low-level platforms at Zurich HB. After the new route opened, the original railway line and tunnel fell into disuse. The railway line was closed in 1989, and by 2002 it had been removed, and the tunnel was filled in and sealed off.

The northern portal of the tunnel can still be observed from a location close to the former Letten railway station and the Letten power station on the banks of the Limmat. The northern approaches to the tunnel, including the bridge over the Limmat, are now used as a cycle and pedestrian path.
