= Weinberg Tunnel =

Railway tunnel in Zürich, Switzerland

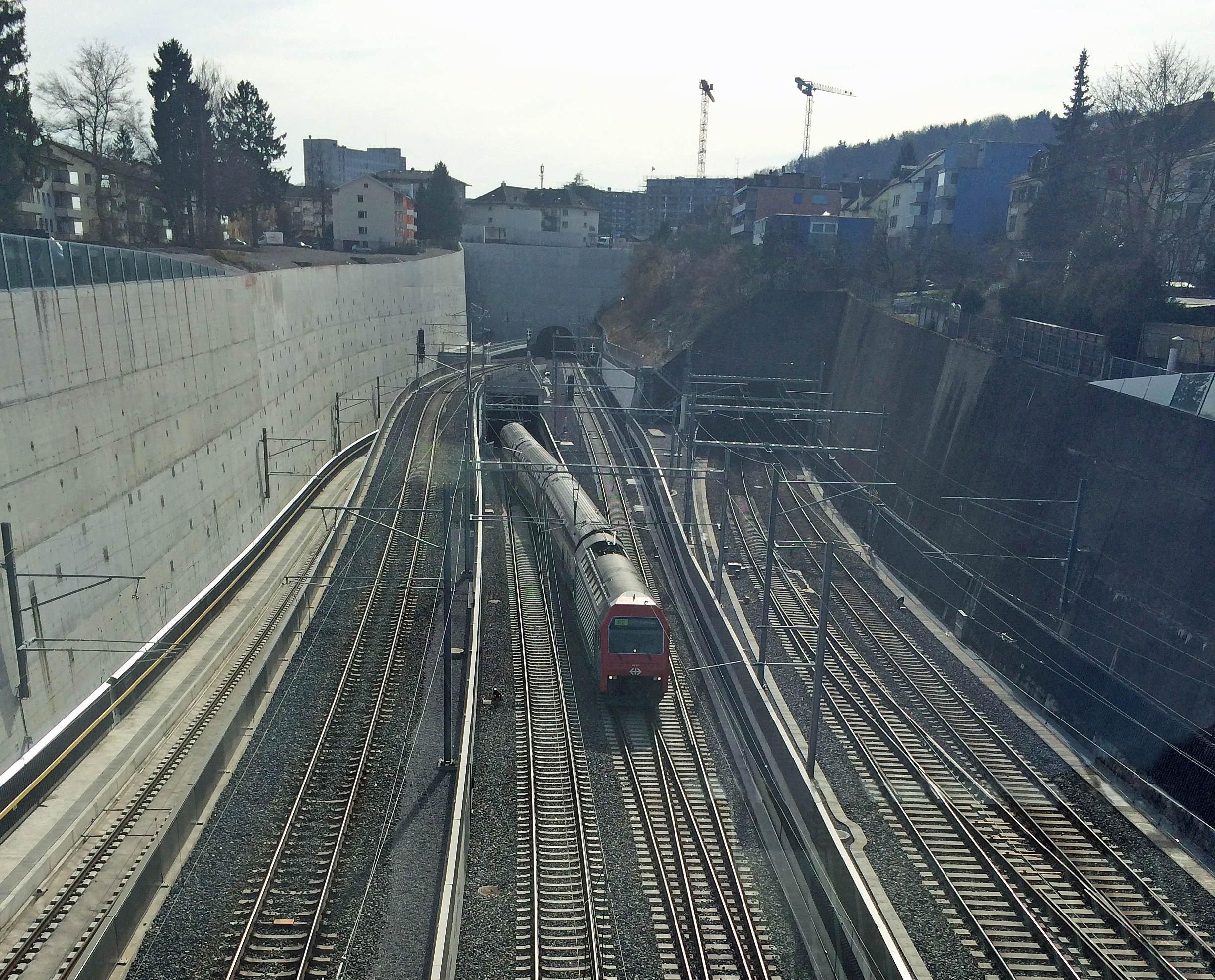
- Tunnel portals at Oerlikon: towards the left at a lower level is the Weinberg tunnel with exiting train; the Wipkingen tunnel in middle, Käferberg tunnel to right

Overview
- Line: Altstetten–Zürich–Oerlikon cross-city line
- Location: Zürich, Switzerland
- Coordinates: 47°23′18.7″N 8°32′39.6″E
- Status: Active

Operation
- Opened: 14 June 2014
- Owner: Swiss Federal Railways
- Operator: Swiss Federal Railways
- Traffic: Rail
- Character: Passenger and freight

Technical
- Length: 4,800 metres (3.0 mi)
- No. of tracks: 2
- Track gauge: 1,435 mm (4 ft 8 1/2 in)
- Electrified: Overhead catenary 15 kV AC 16 2/3 Hz

Route map

The Weinberg Tunnel (German: Weinbergtunnel) is a railway tunnel in the Swiss city of Zürich. The tunnel runs from the western approaches to Zürich Hauptbahnhof railway station, east under the station and city centre before turning north and surfacing on the southern approach to Zürich Oerlikon railway station, and allows trains running between east and west to pass through Zürich without reversal. It includes a new set of underground platforms at Zürich Hauptbahnhof, and carries twin standard gauge (1,435 mm or 4 ft 8 1/2 in) tracks electrified at 15 kV AC 16 2/3 Hz using overhead catenary.

The tunnel was opened on 14 June 2014, and forms part of the Altstetten–Zürich–Oerlikon cross-city line, also known as the Durchmesserlinie Zürich, which also includes new elevated approach tracks from Altstetten to Zürich Hauptbahnhof, and the rebuilding of Oerlikon station with two additional tracks and platforms. At Zürich Hauptbahnhof, the tunnel serves a pair of underground island platforms, with four platform tracks, numbered as Hauptbahnhof tracks 31 to 34 but sometimes referred to as Löwenstrasse station. These platforms are linked to the station's other platforms and facilities, both underground and surface, by a complex of subways and shopping malls.

The Weinberg Tunnel is one of three different routes from Oerlikon to Hauptbahnhof, each of which tunnels through the intermediate ridge. Unlike the Weinberg Tunnel, the other two, the Wipkingen Tunnel and the Käferberg Tunnel, both connect to the Hauptbahnhof's western approaches. All three tunnels emerge from adjacent portals to the south of Oerlikon station.

The tunnel is used by both long-distance passenger trains and by suburban trains on Zürich S-Bahn lines S2, S8 and S14. From December 2015, when the full Altstetten–Zürich–Oerlikon cross-city line is planned to open, it is expected that the line will be served by 460 trains per day, comprising 320 S-Bahn services and 140 long-distance services.

Along its route, the Weinberg tunnel passes under several other tunnels, including the Hirschengraben rail tunnel that links Zürich Hauptbahnhof and Zürich Stadelhofen stations, the now disused Letten rail tunnel, and the Milchbuck road tunnel.

== Gallery ==
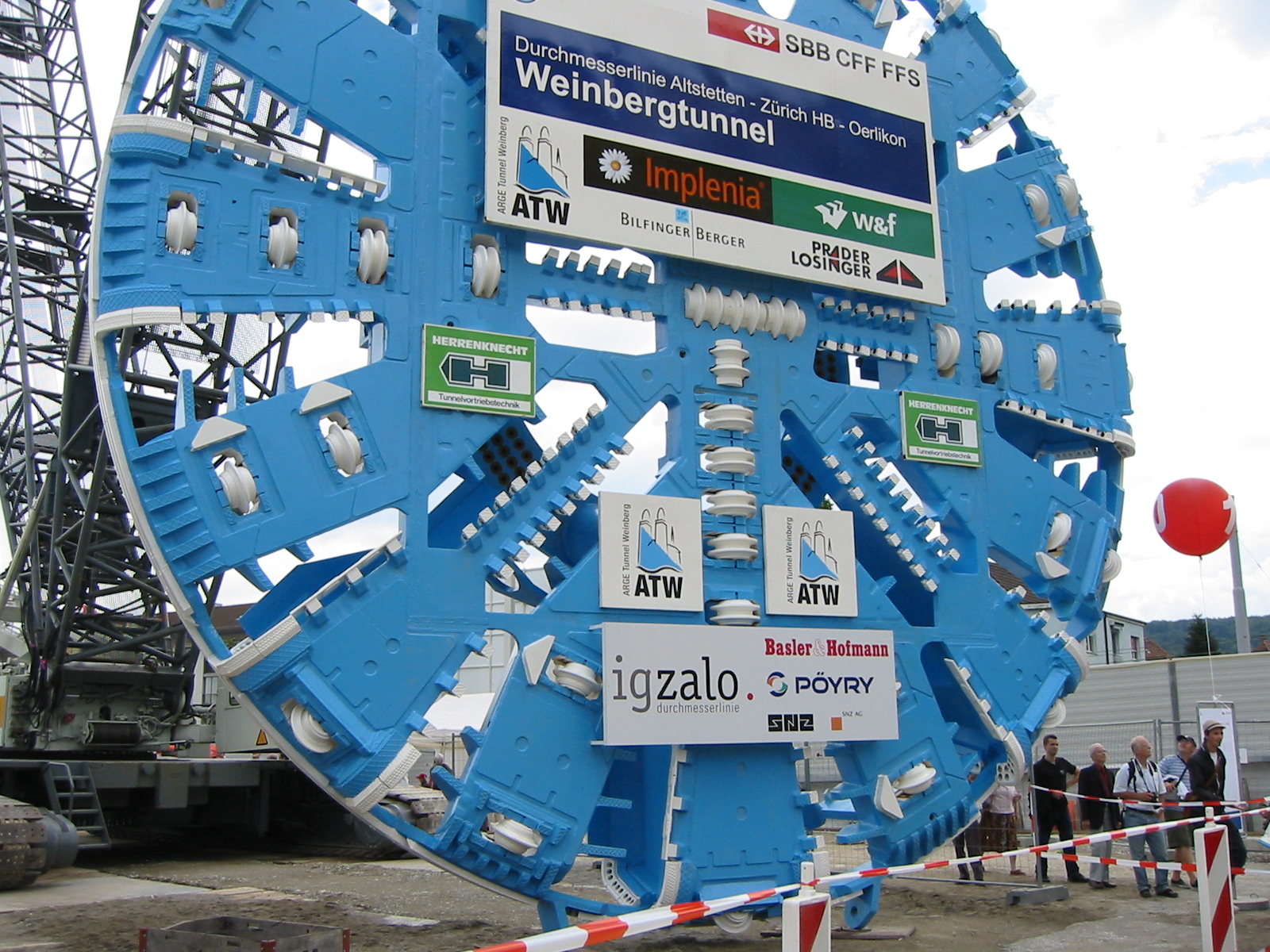
The tunnel boring machine used to bore the tunnel

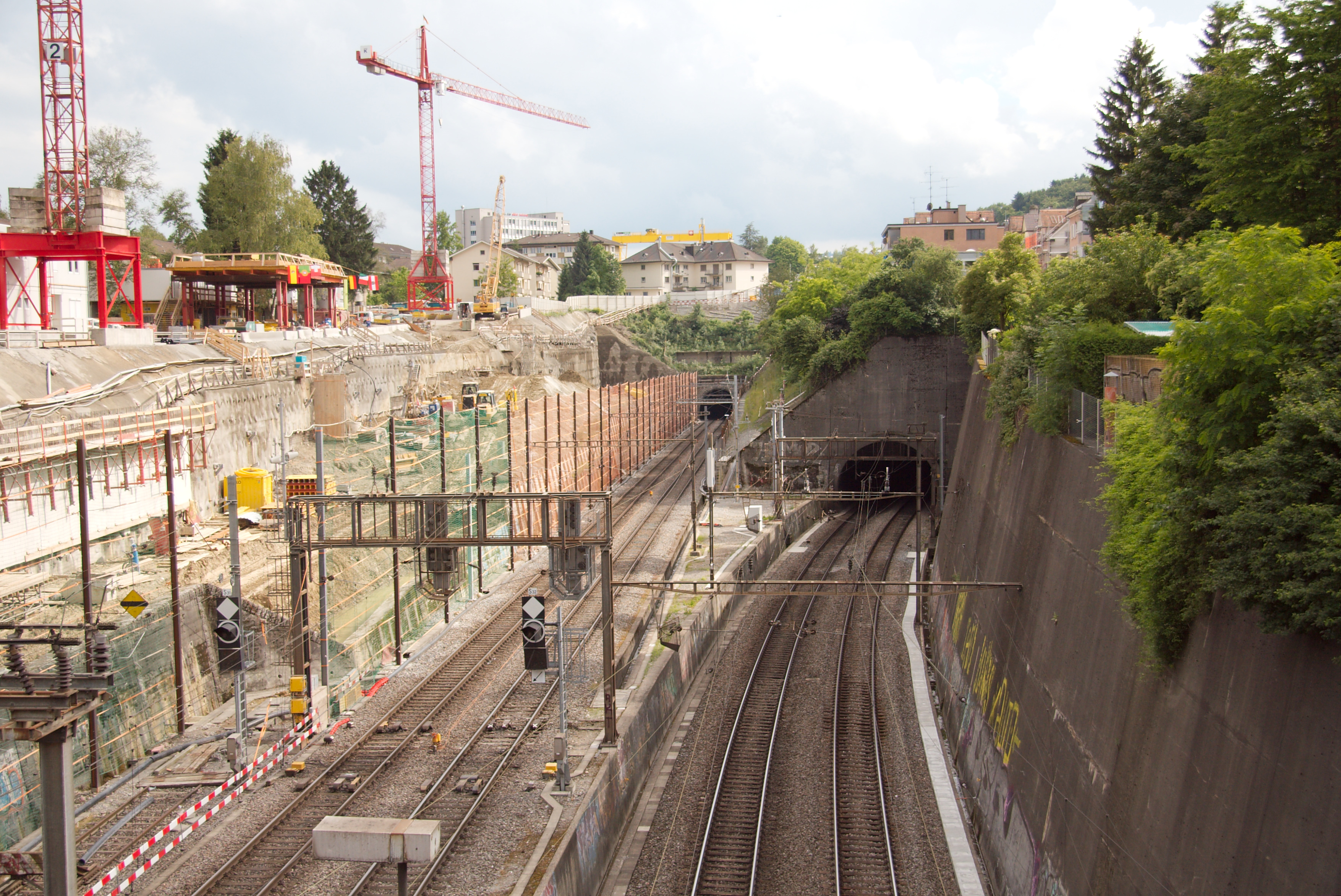
Construction of the Oerlikon portal; Wipkingen and Käferberg tunnels to right

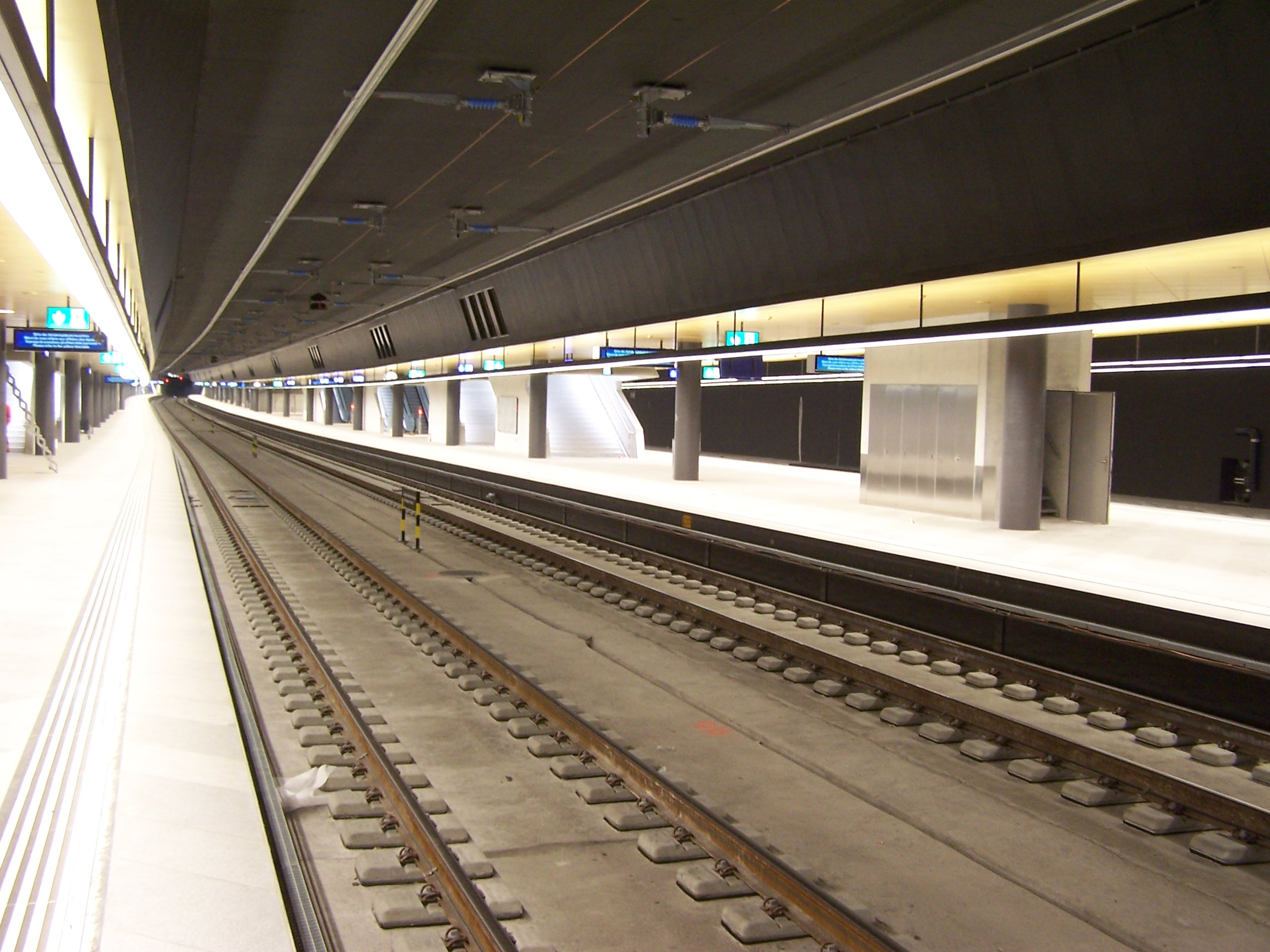
The Löwenstrasse platforms at Zürich Hauptbahnhof, prior to opening
