= Public transport in Zurich =

Aspect of the Swiss city

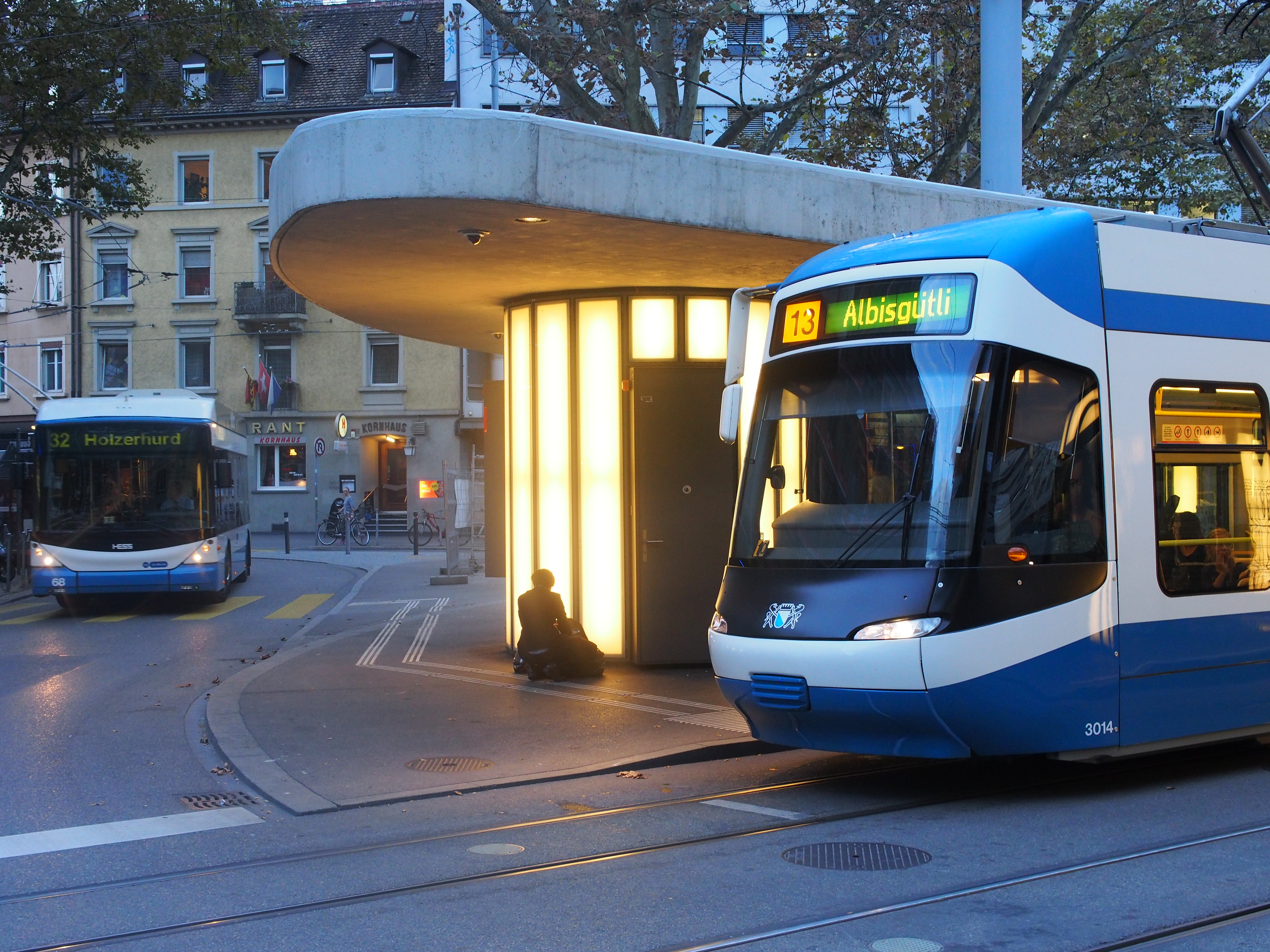
- VBZ bus and tram at Limmatplatz, Zurich

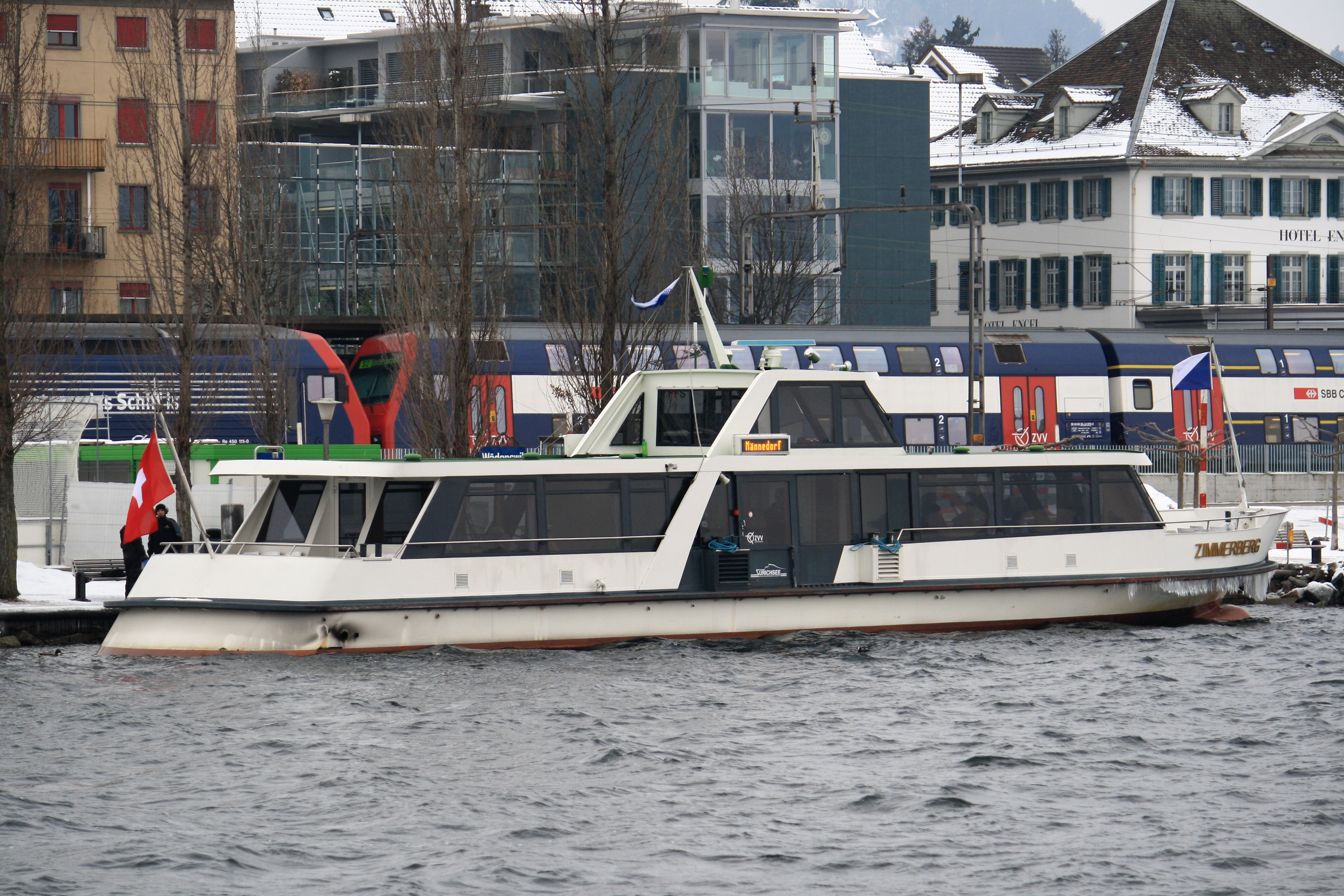
- ZSG boats and Zurich S-Bahn trains (here at Wädenswil station) both link Zurich with nearby municipalities

Overview
- Locale: City of Zurich
- Transit type: Ferry, motorbus, paddle steamer, trolleybus, train, tram
- Daily ridership: Over 1.3 million
- Annual ridership: Over 500 million

Operation
- Operators: Verkehrsbetriebe Zürich (buses, funiculars and trams); Zürcher Verkehrsverbund (S-Bahn); Zürichsee-Schifffahrtsgesellschaft (boats)

Public transport in Zurich is available for four main modes of transport—boat, bus, train and tram—assisting residents of and visitors to Zurich move around the 88 square kilometres (34 sq mi) of Switzerland's largest city and beyond. In 2015, over 300 million trips were made annually on public transport in Zurich, a city with a population of around 450,000. This figure excludes the Zurich S-Bahn, which had annual ridership of 220 million in 2025. Zurich Main Station (Zürich HB), meanwhile, is the largest and busiest railway station in the country.

Map, in French, of the transportation web of the area around Zurich

Public transport is extremely popular in Zurich, and its inhabitants use it in large numbers. In 2010, a microcensus discovered that 32% of Zurich residents used trams or trolleybuses regularly (of which 60% used at least those two modes), while 26% depended on a personal vehicle. Residents live within 400 metres (1,300 ft) of a bus, tram or railway station, and fewer than half of the fixed population owned a car or a motorcycle. About 70% of visitors to the city use the tram or bus, and about half of the journeys within the municipality take place on public transport.

The Zurich model approach to public transport is highly regarded. The city has the world's best on-time performance for public transport, with one of the highest frequencies of service. A network of around 4,000 sensors monitors all traffic, to negate potential delays, and sends information to computers programmed to generate algorithms which change signalling around the city accordingly. When any vehicle approaches one of the city's 400 junctions, sensors buried in the road surface recalibrate signal cycles to give priority to the trams and buses. This efficiency means cross-city journeys on public transport can be completed in thirty minutes or less, even when including transfers.

Founded in 1896, Verkehrsbetriebe Zürich (VBZ) is wholly owned by the City of Zurich. It owns and operates buses, trams and the city's Polybahn and Rigiblick funiculars. The entire VBZ network is operated on a proof-of-payment fare system, meaning if passengers do not present a ticket when asked by an inspector, the passenger will be liable for a fine. Fares and fines cover around half of the system's operating and capital costs.

The S-Bahn is operated by Zürcher Verkehrsverbund (ZVV), not VBZ. ZVV, established in 1990, is the largest public-transport network in Switzerland. All modes of public transport within a chosen number of fare zones can be used freely with a ticket that is valid for a certain amount of time (one hour, 24 hours, 1 month, 1 year). The zones in the canton of Zurich are numbered from 110 to 184 (downtown Zurich is fare zone 110). Zones 180 to 184 are those outside the borders of the canton. Passengers purchase a base ticket for particular zones; upgrades and extension tickets are available as supplements.

As part of Zurich's plan to be net-zero by 2040, several upgrades to the public transport network were announced in 2024. In 2022, Zurich ranked fifth in the Urban Mobility Readiness Index, which measures the preparedness of a city for mobility's next chapter.

Although in the canton of Zurich, Zurich Airport (Zürich Flughafen), is located in Kloten, a municipality around 9 kilometres (5.6 mi) north of Zurich. As of 2025, it is served by 66 passenger airlines from around the world. A ten-minute train ride brings passengers into Zurich.

== Boat ==
The Lake Zurich Navigation Company (German: Zürichsee-Schifffahrtsgesellschaft (ZSG)), established in the late 19th century, operates passenger vessels on Lake Zurich and the Limmat river. A member of the ZVV, as of 2015 it runs seventeen passenger ships (two of them—the DS Stadt Zurich and DS Stadt Rapperswil—being converted paddle steamers from the 1900s), carrying around 1.2 million passengers annually from Bürkliplatz, at the northern end of Lake Zurich, to landing stages on the lake and along the river (as far north as the Swiss National Museum). Other excursions include 90-minute round-trips to Erlenbach and cruises across the lake which can take over four hours.

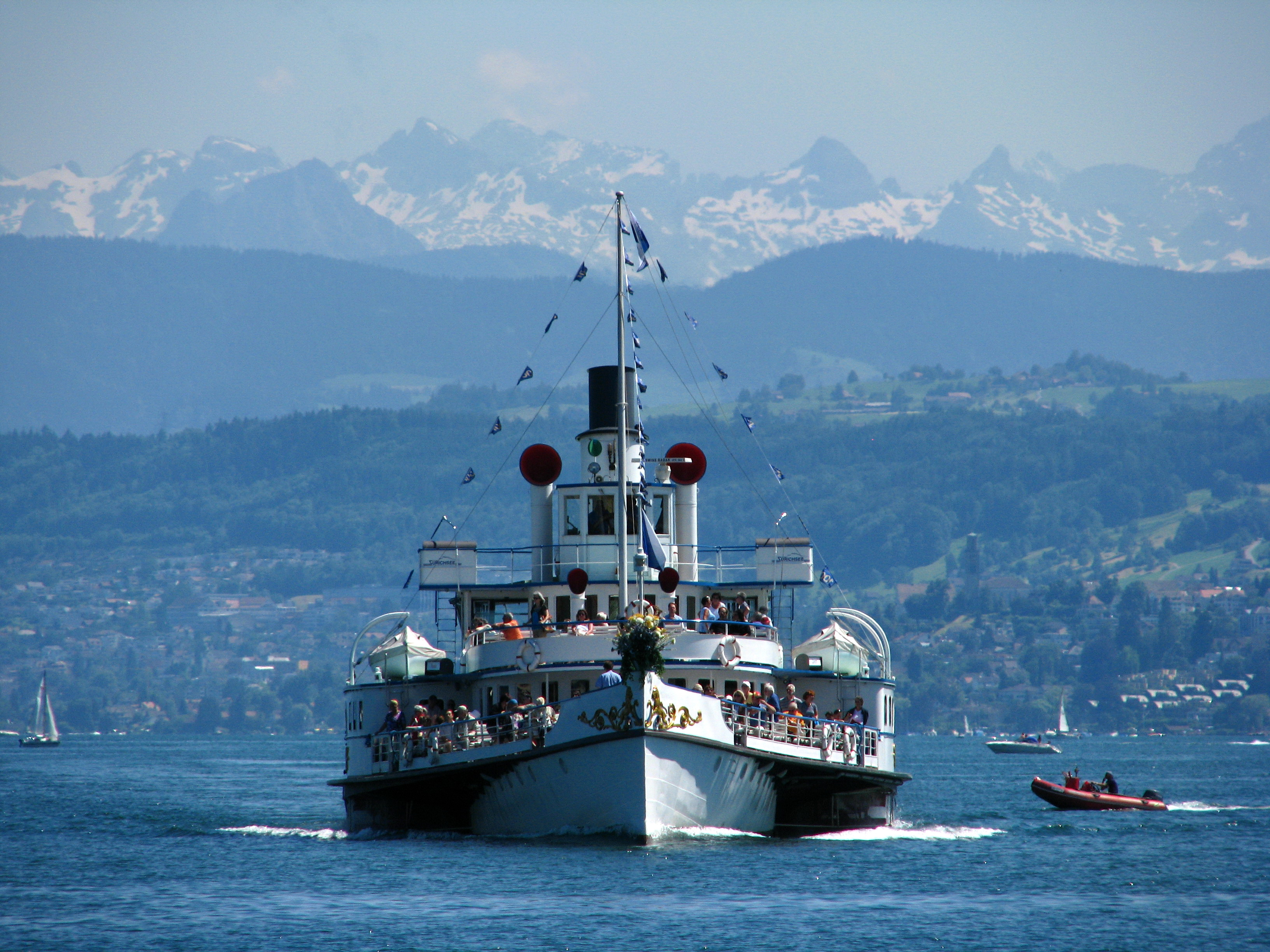
The DS Stadt Zurich paddle steamer on Lake Zurich in 2009

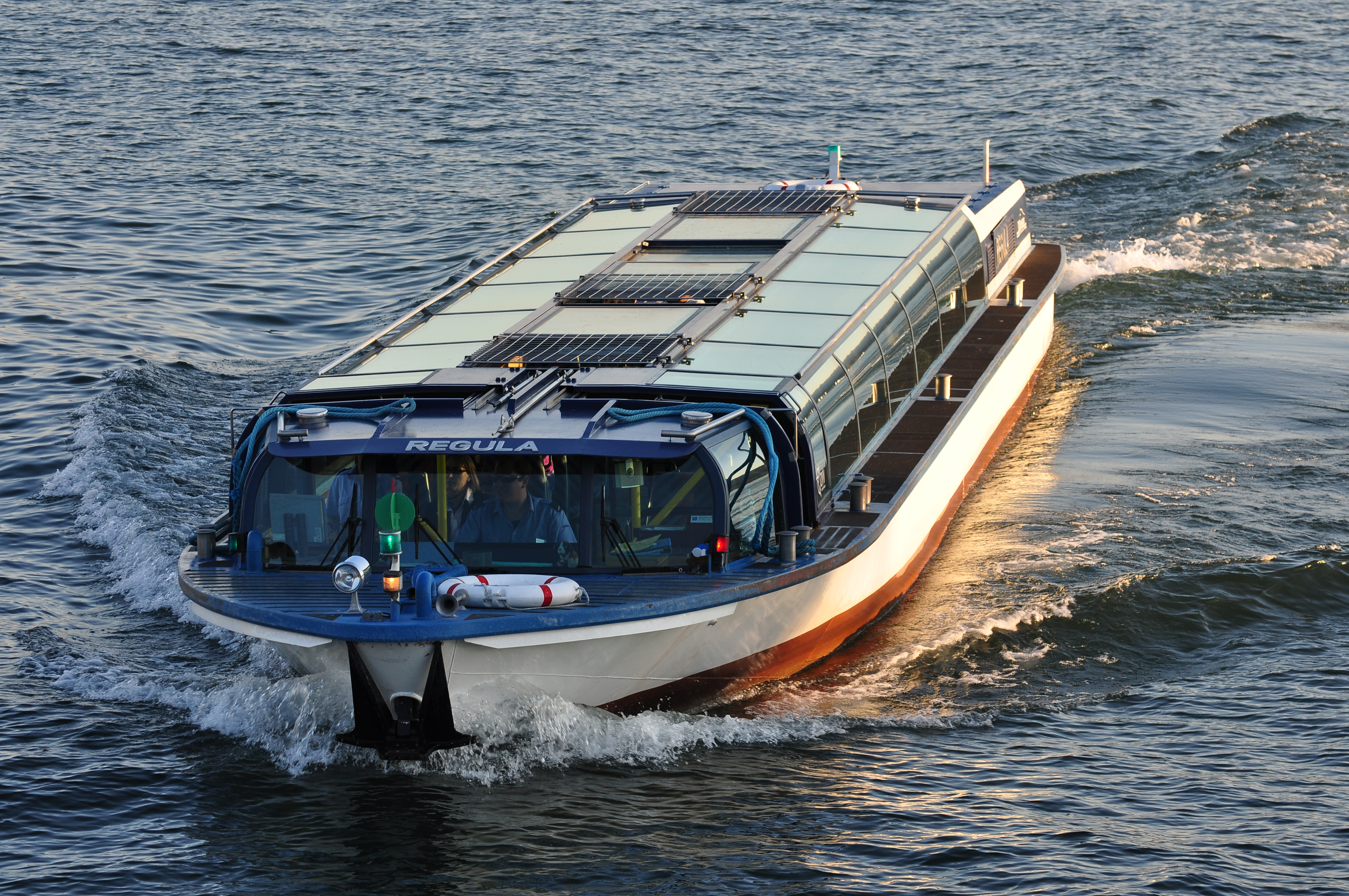
Boat operating on Lake Zurich and the river Limmat within the city centre

== Bus ==
=== Trolleybus ===
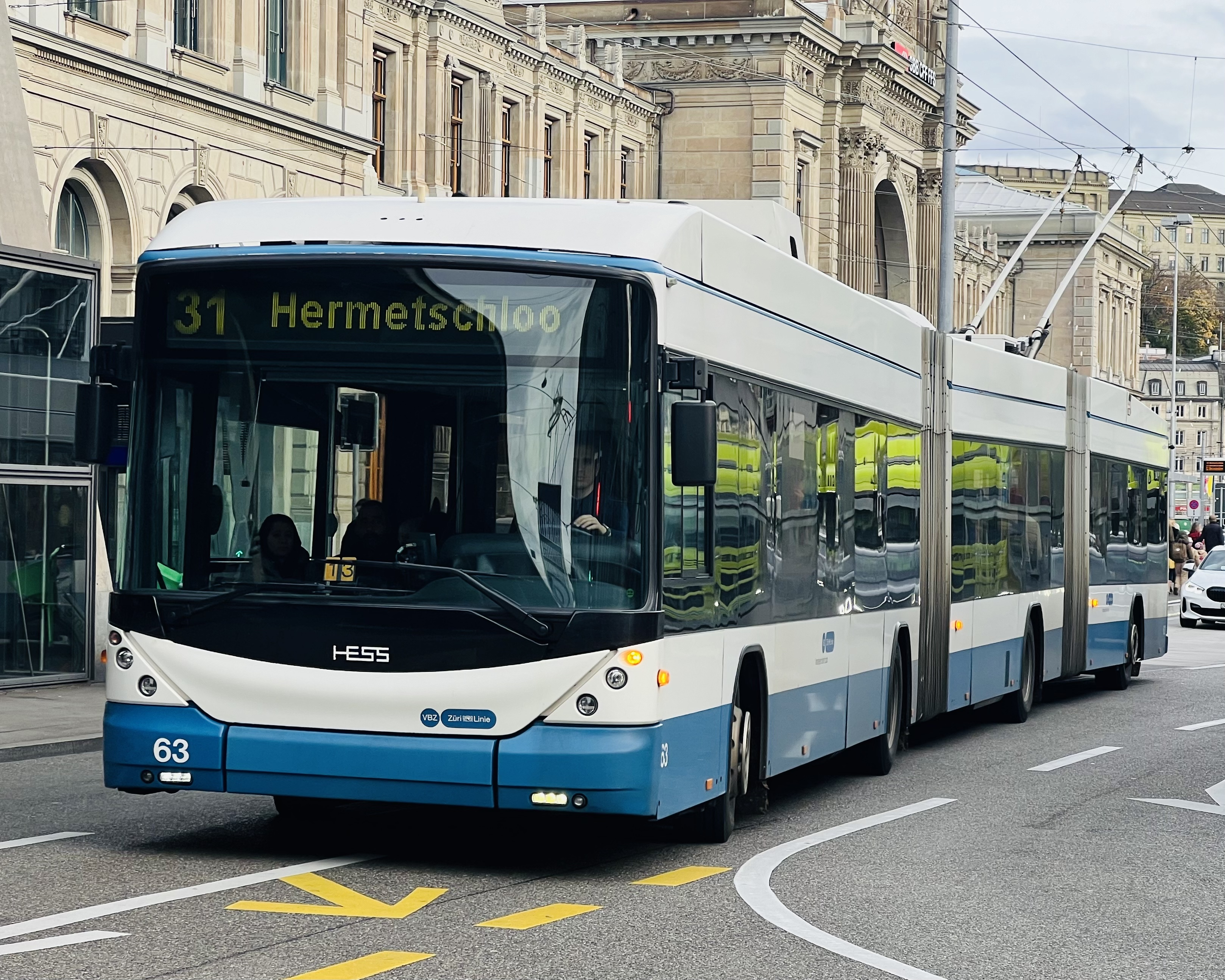
A Hess lighTram on line 31 at Zurich Main Station in 2023

Zurich's trolleybus system was implemented in 1939. As of 2021, it has six lines and a total route length of 54.0 km (33.6 mi). Like the trams and the funicular, the bus system is owned and operated by Verkehrsbetriebe Zürich (VBZ). The city's original trolleybus, which ran between Bezirksgebäude and Bucheggplatz, is now part of line 32.

The six trolleybus lines are numbered 31, 32, 33, 46, 72 and 83, each with an identifying colour on network maps. As of 2015, around 54 million people used the buses annually.

Line no.	Route
31	Kienastenwies – Central – Bahnhofplatz/HB – Bhf. Altstetten – Hermetschloo
32	Holzerhurd – Helvetiaplatz – Kalkbreite/Bhf. Wiedikon – Friesenberg – Strassenverkehrsamt
33	Triemli – Bhf. Hardbrücke – Bhf. Wipkingen – Bahnhof Tiefenbrunnen
46	Bahnhofquai/HB – Bhf. Wipkingen – Rütihof
72	Milchbuck – Bhf. Hardbrücke – Morgental
83	Milchbuck – Bhf. Hardbrücke – Bhf. Altstetten

In 2012, the trolleybus fleet totalled 114 vehicles, of which 83 were articulated and 31 were bi-articulated.

=== Motorbus ===
VBZ also operate 59 motor bus lines, carrying around 37 million passengers annually (as of 2015). The lines can be broken down into urban routes (eighteen lines), district routes (nine local minibus-operated feeder lines within the city) and regional routes (32 lines in the region around the city). Other operators of motor buses in/into the city are AVA, AZZK, PostAuto and VBG. Other operators in the canton of Zurich are VZO and Zimmerbergbus.

The motor bus lines serving stops in the city are 37, 38, 39, 40, 42, 45, 61, 62, 64, 66, 67, 69, 70, 73, 75, 76, 77, 78, 80 (a hybrid), 89, 91, 99, 151, 161, 165, 184, 185, 200, 210, 215, 220, 235, 236, 245, 304, 307, 350, 444, 445, 485, 492, 701, 703, 704, 742, 743, 744, 745, 751, 752, 754, 759, 760, 761, 762, 768, 781, 787, 912 and 916. With the exception of some VBZ lines, motor bus lines appear in the same colour (light blue) on network maps. In 2020, it was announced that lines 69 and 80 would become electrified around 2025.

Eight fully electric "neighbourhood buses" were ordered from Swiss vehicle manufacturer Carrosserie Hess in 2021, for use on lines 35, 38, 39, 40, 64, 73, 79 and 307. Line 79 was later subsumed into line 75.

In 2022, the purchase of thirteen battery-powered articulated and thirteen bi-articulated buses from Hess was initiated, with planned introduction to the network in 2024. Up to 140 additional vehicles are planned, for use on the expanding electric operation of the network, as well as to replace the aging current fleet.

In 2024, seven routes began a two-year pilot project of using Swiss eBus plus buses. The routes are 35, 38, 39, 40, 42, 64 and 73.

The city also has a nighttime bus network (lines N1–N18, N71, N74–N76, N78, N91) run by motor buses, in addition to the nighttime S-Bahn. Moreover, during the Long Night of Museums in Zurich (Lange Nacht der Zürcher Museen), motor buses lines M1–M5 shuttle between participating museums.

== Train ==
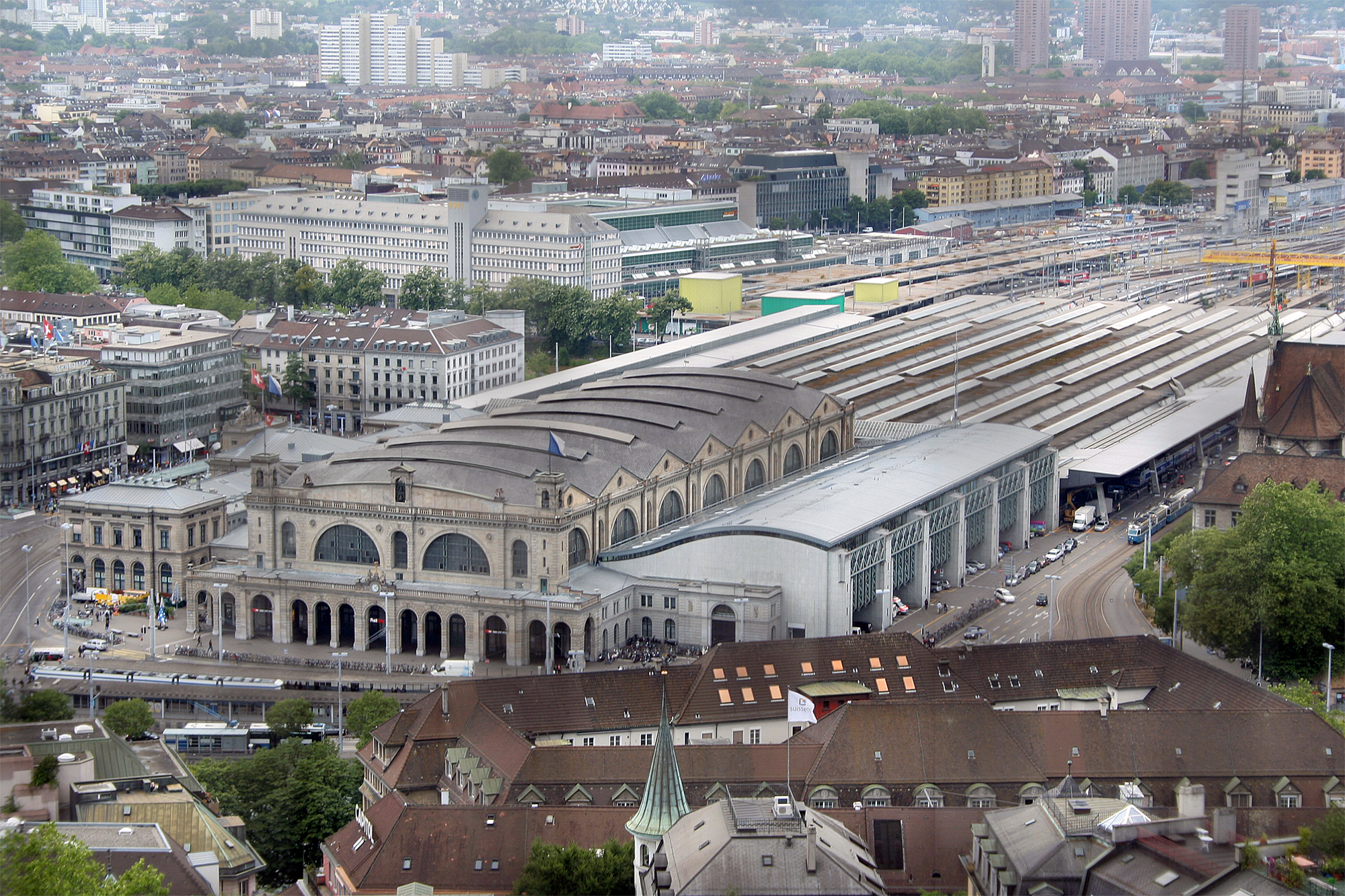
Zurich Main Station

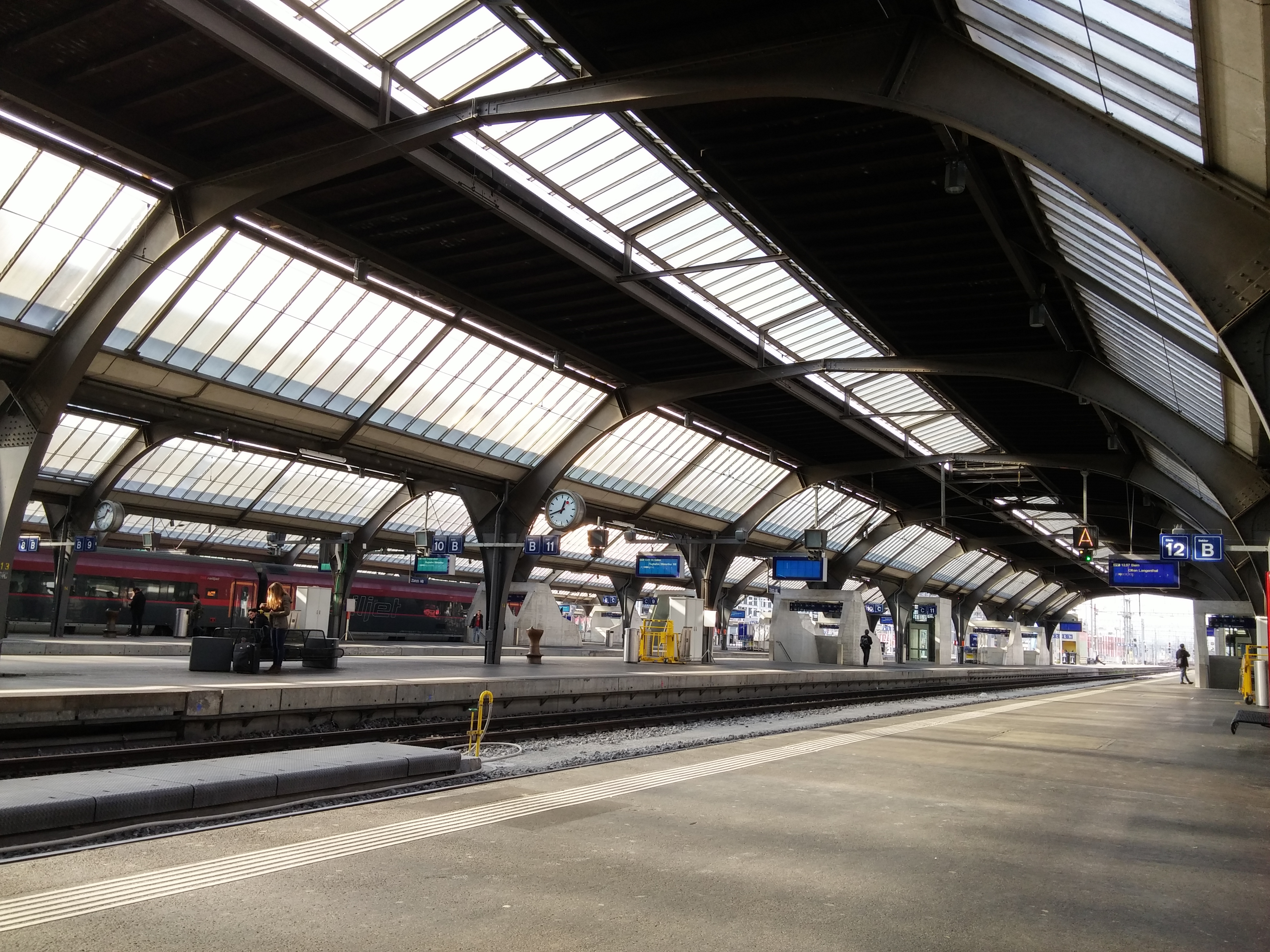
The surface platforms (tracks 3–18) at Main Station

S-Bahn map as of 2018

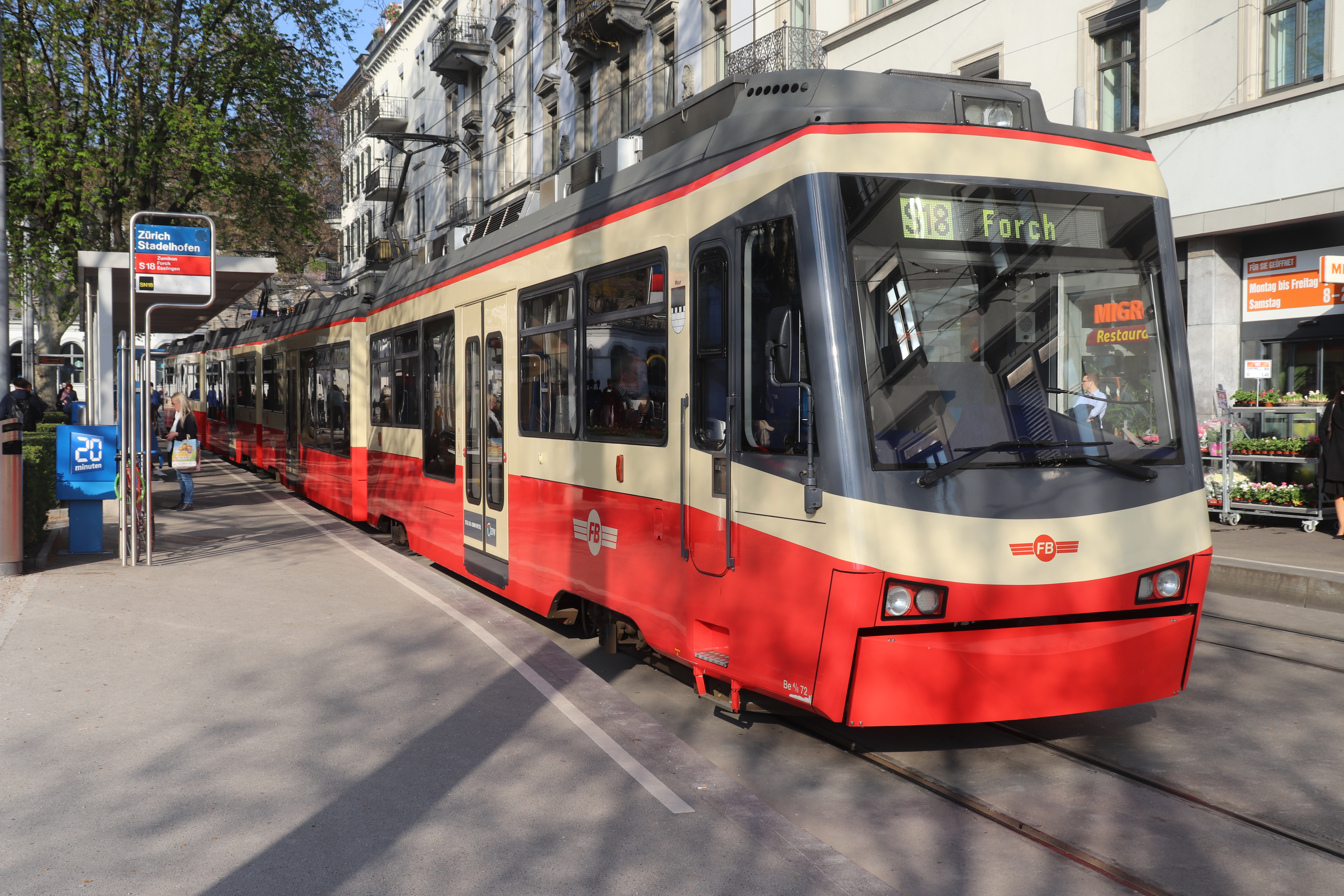
A Forchbahn tram at the Stadelhofen stop in Zurich running on the S18 line (2019)

The Zurich S-Bahn, and its 390 kilometres (240 mi) of track, covers both the entire canton of Zurich and sections of neighbouring cantons, such as Aargau and St. Gallen, and even into southern Germany. The S-Bahn was officially established by ZVV in 1990, but several lines were already in operation.

The railway network is mainly operated by the Swiss Federal Railways, but Zurich is also served by major EuroCity trains from the neighbouring countries and is a destination for both French/Swiss (TGV Lyria) and German (ICE) high-speed trains, as well as by Austrian RailJet.

Unusual for rapid-transit services, the S-Bahn provides first-class commuter travel; about a quarter of seats on each train are first class.

Prior to the construction of the S-Bahn, most Zurich-bound trains terminated at Zurich Main Station (Zürich HB). The exception was the lines of the Sihltal Zürich Uetliberg Bahn (SZU), which terminated at Zürich Selnau.

With its thirteen platforms and 26 tracks, Zürich HB, completed in 1871, is the largest and busiest station in Switzerland and is an important railway hub in Europe. As of early 2020, it served around 470,000 passengers and nearly 3,000 trains every day.

There are 27 other railway stations in the municipality of Zurich: Affoltern, Altstetten, Balgrist, Binz, Brunau, Enge, Friesenberg, Giesshübel, Hardbrücke, Hegibachplatz, Kreuzplatz, Leimbach, Manegg, Oerlikon, Rehalp, Saalsporthalle, Schweighof, Seebach, Selnau, Stadelhofen, Stadelhofen (FB), Stettbach, Tiefenbrunnen, Triemli, Wiedikon, Wipkingen and Wollishofen. Three of these stations—Stadelhofen, Oerlikon and Hardbrücke—are among the ten busiest railway stations in Switzerland. Another railway station, Letten, has been disused since 1989.

As of 2021, the S-Bahn is composed of 32 lines. 21 of these pass through Zürich HB. Twenty of the routes are operated by Swiss Federal Railways (SBB), six by Thurbo, two each by SZU and Südostbahn (SOB) and one each by Aargau Verkehr (AVA) and Forchbahn (FB). Again, each line is identified with a colour. The Forchbahn uses line S18 for its arrivals to and departures from Zürich Stadelhofen FB.

Line no.	Route	Operator
S2	Zürich Flughafen –Oerlikon–Zürich HB–Thalwil–Pfäffikon SZ–Ziegelbrücke	SBB
S3	(Bülach–) Hardbrücke–Zürich HB–Effretikon–Wetzikon	SBB
S4	Zürich HB–Adliswil–Langnau-Gattikon (–Sihlwald)	SZU
S5	Zug–Affoltern am Albis–Zürich HB–Uster–Wetzikon–Rapperswil–Pfäffikon SZ	SBB
S6	Baden AG–Regensdorf-Watt–Hardbrücke–Zürich HB–Uetikon	SBB
S7	Winterthur–Kloten–Hardbrücke–Zürich HB–Meilen–Rapperswil	SBB
S8	Winterthur–Wallisellen–Oerlikon–Zürich HB–Thalwil–Freienbach SBB-Pfäffikon SZ (–Ziegelbrücke)	SBB
S9	(Schaffhausen–) Rafz–Hardbrücke–Zürich HB–Uster	SBB
S10	Zürich HB–Zürich Triemli–Uetliberg	SZU
S11	Aarau–Lenzburg–Dietikon–Zürich HB–Zürich Stettbach–Winterthur–Seuzach/Sennhof-Kyburg (–Wila)	SBB
S12	Brugg AG–Zürich HB–Zürich Stettbach– Winterthur–Schaffhausen/Wil SG	SBB
S13	Wädenswil–Samstagern–Einsiedeln	SOB
S14	Affoltern am Albis–Zürich HB–Oerlikon–Uster–Wetzikon–Hinwil	SBB
S15	Niederweningen–Hardbrücke–Zürich HB–Uster–Wetzikon–Rapperswil	SBB
S16	Zürich Flughafen –Hardbrücke–Zürich HB–Herrliberg-Feldmeilen (–Meilen)	SBB
S17	Dietikon–Bremgarten–Bremgarten West–Wohlen	AVA
S18	Zürich Stadelhofen–Zürich Rehalp–Forch–Esslingen	FB
S19	(Koblenz–Baden–) Dietikon–Zürich HB–Oerlikon–Effretikon (–Pfäffikon ZH )	SBB
S20	Uerikon–Zürich HB–Hardbrücke	SBB
S21	Regensdorf-Watt–Hardbrücke–Zürich HB	SBB
S23	Zürich HB–Zürich Stadelhofen–Winterthur–Frauenfeld–Romanshorn	SBB
S24	Thayngen/Weinfelden–Winterthur–Zürich Flughafen –Wipkingen–Zürich HB–Thalwil–Zug	SBB
S25	Zürich HB–Pfäffikon SZ–Ziegelbrücke–Glarus–Linthal	SBB
S26	Winterthur–Bauma–Rüti ZH	Thurbo
S29	Winterthur–Stein am Rhein	Thurbo
S30	Winterthur–Frauenfeld–Weinfelden (–Romanshorn–Rorschach)	Thurbo
S33	Winterthur–Andelfingen–Schaffhausen	SBB
S35	Winterthur–Wil SG	Thurbo
S36	Waldshut–Bad Zurzach–Bülach	Thurbo
S40	Rapperswil–Pfäffikon SZ–Samstagern–Einsiedeln	SOB
S41	Winterthur–Bülach	Thurbo
S42	Zürich HB–Othmarsingen–Muri AG	SBB

=== Nighttime services ===
Between Friday night and Sunday night, ZVV runs nighttime S-Bahn services (designated SN followed by the route number) and nighttime bus services (designated N followed by the line number). Nighttime services operate from 1 o'clock until the early morning hours. The nighttime S-Bahn and bus routes form a network, which is different from the daytime network. Most SN services run hourly. In 2025, it was reported that around 30,000 passengers per night were using the night network. Approximately 80 percent of these were leisure travelers, with the balance being commuters. The numbers were being examined by ZVV to see whether it is viable to introduce a 24/7 schedule. It would also evaluate if it was necessary to extend lines running on weekdays.

As of December 2022, the following nighttime S-Bahn services are active:

Line no.	Route	Operator
SN1	Winterthur – Stettbach – Zürich HB – Dietikon – Baden – Brugg AG – Lenzburg – Aarau	SBB
SN3	Winterthur – Andelfingen – Schaffhausen (– Stein am Rhein)	THURBO
SN4	Zürich HB – Langnau-Gattikon	SZU
SN5	Knonau – Zürich HB – Uster – Rapperswil – Pfäffikon SZ	SBB
SN6	Würenlos – Zürich HB – Winterthur	SBB
SN7	Bassersdorf – Kloten – Zürich HB – Meilen – Stäfa	SBB
SN8	Pfäffikon ZH – Effretikon – Wallisellen – Zürich HB – Wädenswil – Pfäffikon SZ – Lachen	SBB
SN9	Bülach – Zürich HB – Uster	SBB
SN11	Winterthur – Zürich HB – Mellingen Heitersberg – Aarau – Olten	SBB
SN18	Zürich Stadelhofen – Egg	FB
SN41	Winterthur – Embrach-Rorbas – Bülach	THURBO
SN65	Bülach – Rafz – Jestetten – Schaffhausen	THURBO

== Tram ==
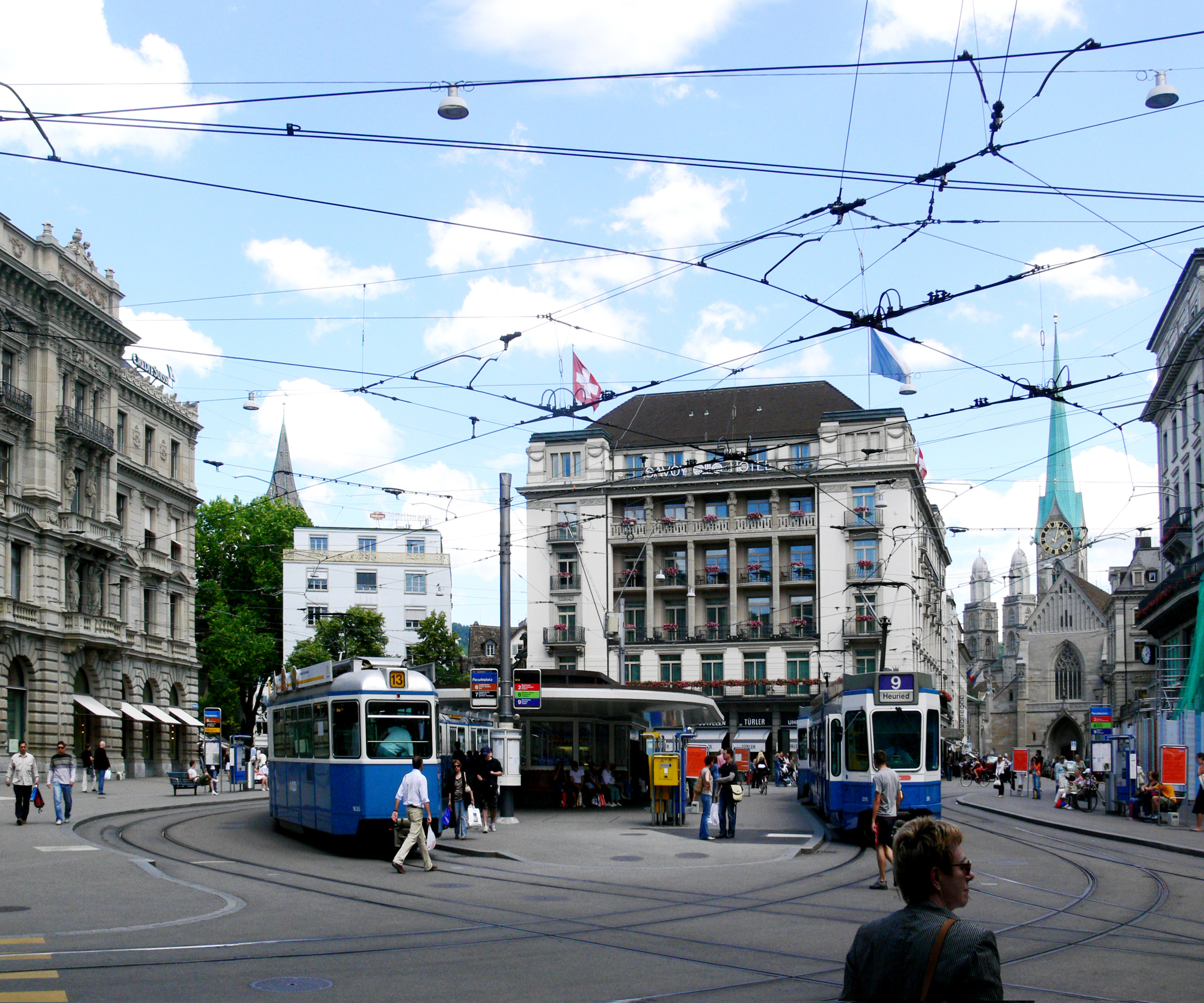
Paradeplatz (tram stop) is one of the key nodes of the Zurich tram network, served by seven lines

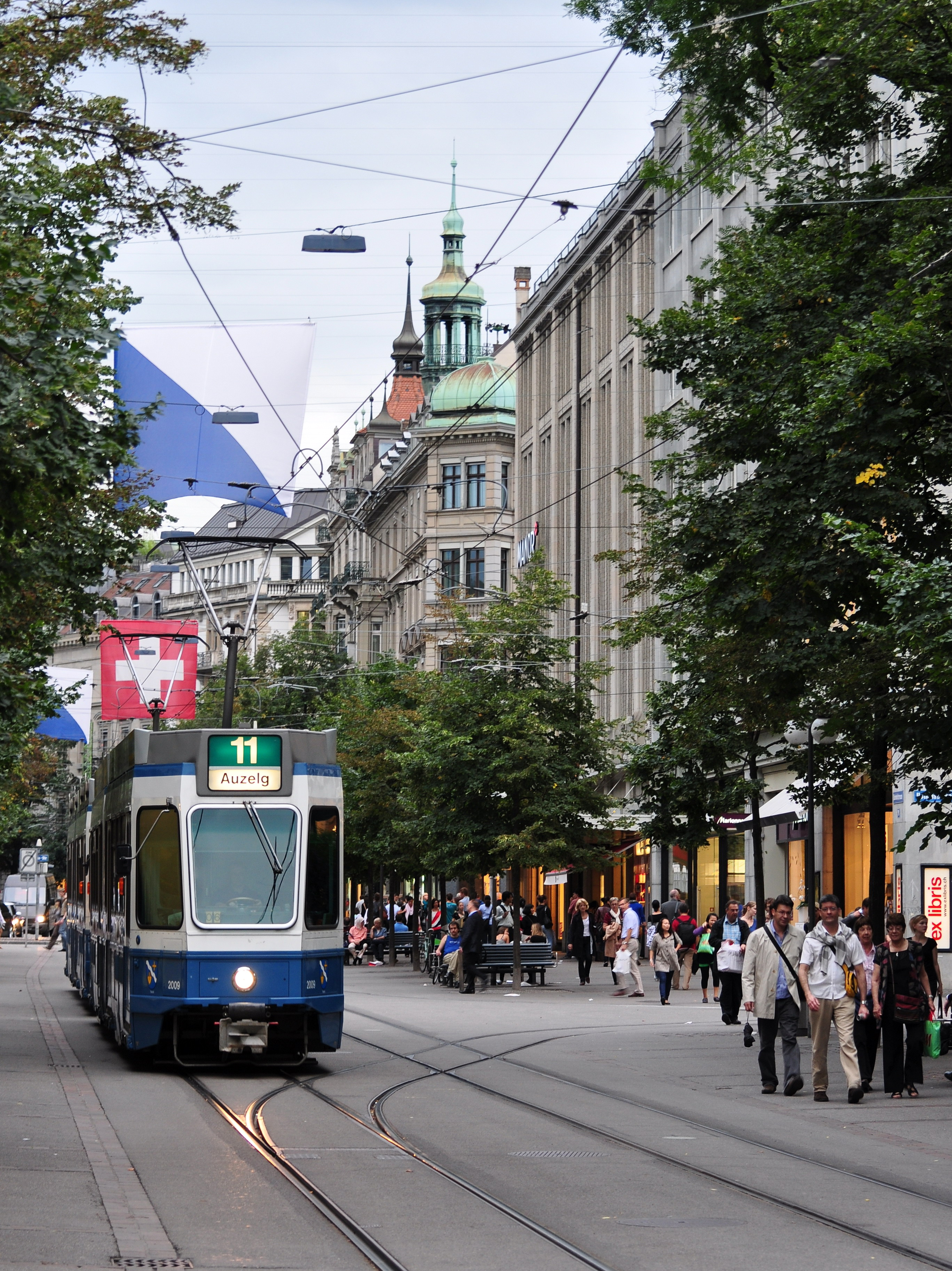
A tram travelling north on Zurich's Bahnhofstrasse, approaching Zurich Main Station

Like the buses and the funicular, Zurich's tram system is owned and operated by VBZ, although the Glattalbahn (owned by Verkehrsbetriebe Glattal (VBG)) and the Limmattalbahn use part of its lines (lines 2 and 20 for the Limmattalbahn; lines 10–12 for VBG). The first trams began operating in 1882, and were horse-drawn.

The trams run on metre-gauge tracks and are powered by overhead lines at 600 V DC. The same system powers the city's trolleybuses. Depending on the locale, tracks are either fully segregated from motor vehicles or they share the road and are each controlled by dedicated traffic signals.

As of May 2025, there are sixteen lines, each with their own identifying colour, serving the city's 185 stations and carrying around 200 million passengers per year. Nine of the lines serve Zürich HB. Due to construction work ar Bahnhofquai/HB, several lines are re-routed from 14 December 2025 to 12 December 2026, and two additional lines, 50 and 51, temporarily serve the northern part of the network (18 lines in total).

Tram network December 2025 – December 2026
Line	Selected stops on the line	Notes
2	Klusplatz – Römerhof – Kreuzplatz – Bhf. Stadelhofen – Bellevue – Bürkliplatz – Paradeplatz – Stauffacher – Albisriederplatz – Farbhof – Bhf. Schlieren – Schlieren Geissweid	
3	Klusplatz – Römerhof – Kunsthaus – Central – Bahnhofplatz/HB – Stauffacher – Albisriederplatz – Albisrieden	
4	Rehalp – Kreuzplatz – Bhf. Stadelhofen – Bellevue – Central – Bahnhofstrasse/HB	continues as line 13 from Bahnhofstrasse/HB
5	Laubegg – Bhf. Enge – Bürkliplatz – Bellevue – Bhf. Stadelhofen	
6	Bahnhofplatz/HB – Central – ETH/Universitätsspital – Kirche Fluntern – Zoo	continues as line 14 from Bahnhofplatz/HB
7	Bhf. Stettbach – Schwamendingerplatz – Milchbuck – Schaffhauserplatz – Central – Bahnhofstrasse/HB – Paradeplatz – Bhf. Enge – Bhf. Wollishofen – Wollishoferplatz	
8	Hardturm – Escher-Wyss-Platz – Bhf. Hardbrücke – Hardplatz – Stauffacher – Bhf. Selnau – Bhf. Enge – Bürkliplatz – Bellevue – Kunsthaus – Kirche Fluntern (– Zoo)	
9	Hirzenbach – Schwamendingerplatz – Milchbuck – Seilbahn Rigiblick – ETH/Universitätsspital – Kunsthaus – Bellevue – Bürkliplatz – Paradeplatz – Stauffacher – Heuried (– Triemli)	
10	Bahnhofstrasse/HB (Note: Only boarding) – (Bahnhofplatz/HB (Note: Only deboarding) –) Central – ETH/Universitätsspital – Seilbahn Rigiblick – Milchbuck – Sternen Oerlikon – Bhf. Oerlikon Ost – Glattpark – Bhf. Glattbrugg – Zürich Flughafen (Zurich)	
11	Bhf. Tiefenbrunnen – Bellevue – Bürkliplatz – Paradeplatz – Bahnhofstrasse/HB	continues as line 15 from Bahnhofstrasse/HB (towards Central)
12	Zurich Flughafen (Zürich) – Bhf.Glattbrugg – Glattpark – Auzelg – Bhf. Wallisellen – Glattzentrum – Bhf. Stettbach	
13	Albisgütli – Laubegg – Bhf. Enge – Paradeplatz – Bahnhofstrasse/HB	continues as line 4 from Bahnhofstrasse/HB
14	Bahnhofplatz/HB – Stauffacher – Heuried – Triemli	continues as line 6 from Bahnhofplatz/HB
15	Bhf. Tiefenbrunnen – Bellevue – Central	continues as line 11 from Central (towards Bahnhofstrasse/HB)
17	Bucheggplatz – Schaffhauserplatz – Sihlquai/HB – Escher-Wyss-Platz – Hardturm – Werdhölzli	
20	Bhf. Altstetten – Farbhof – Bhf. Schlieren – Schlieren Geissweid – Spital Limmattal – Bhf. Dietikon – Shoppi Tivoli – Bhf. Killwangen-Spreitenbach	
50	Frankental – Meierhofplatz – Escher-Wyss-Platz – Sihlquai/HB – Schaffhauserplatz – Bucheggplatz – Bhf. Oerlikon – Sternen Oerlikon – Messe/Hallenstadion – Glattpark – Auzelg	temporary construction line
51	Seebach – Bhf. Oerlikon Ost – Sternen Oerlikon – Milchbuck – Schaffhauserplatz – Sihlquai/HB – Escher-Wyss-Platz – Bhf. Altstetten Nord	temporary construction line

As of 2012, the VBZ owns 313 trams. All regular public services are covered by 289 vehicles of two basic classes, with the remainder of the fleet made up of a number of assorted works vehicles, including some used for the cargo tram service and heritage vehicles.

== See also ==
- Federal Office of Transport
- Transport in Switzerland
