= Rümlang railway station =

Railway station in Zurich, Switzerland

Rümlang
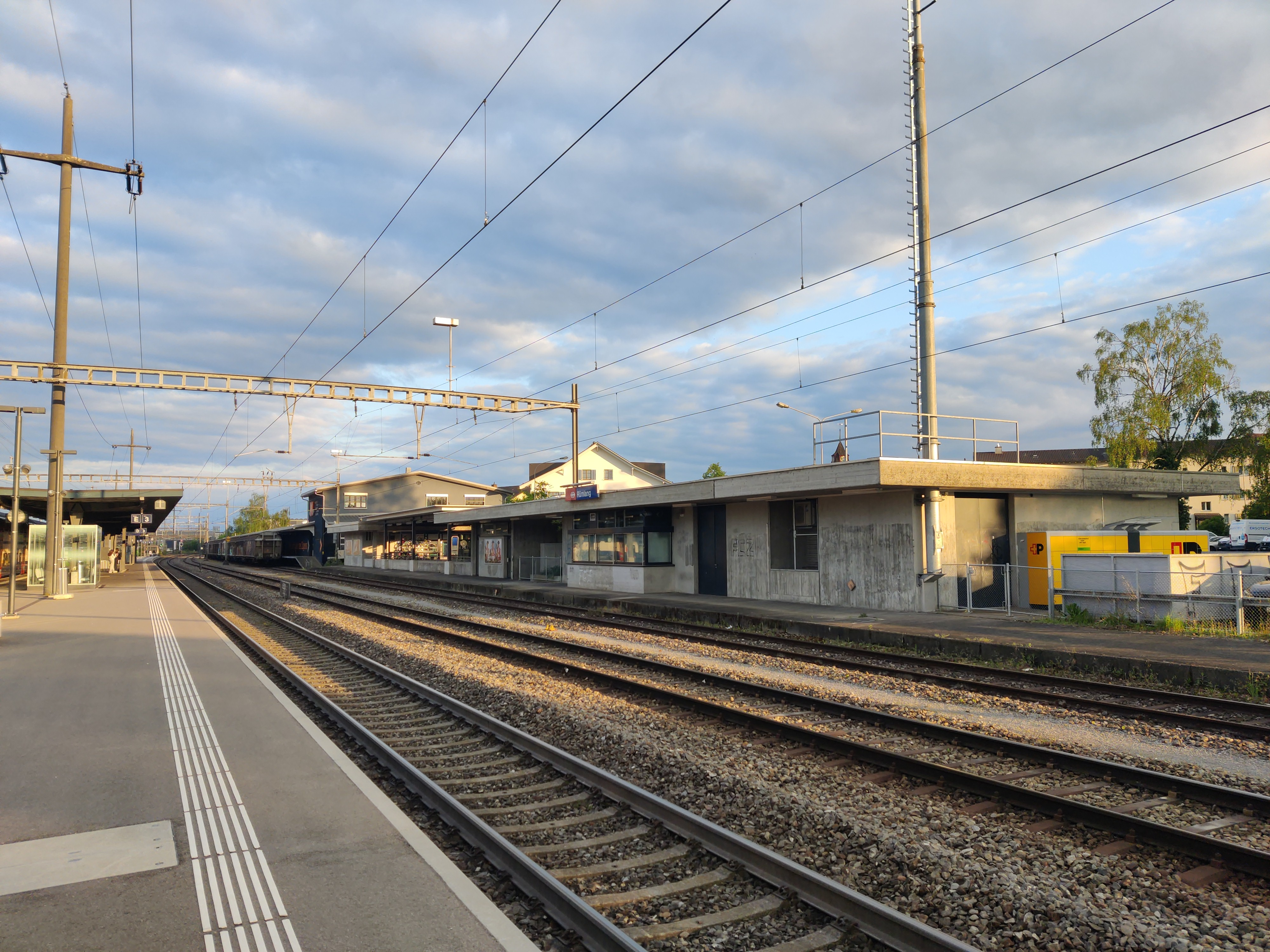
- The station and platforms in 2024

General information
- Location: Bahnhofstrasse; Rümlang; Canton of Zurich; Switzerland
- Coordinates: 47.45425°N 8.53276°E
- Elevation: 430 m (1,410 ft)
- Owner: Swiss Federal Railways
- Operator: Swiss Federal Railways
- Line: Oerlikon–Bülach
- Platforms: 1 island platform
- Tracks: 4
- Connections: Zurich Transport Network (ZVV)
- Bus: PostAuto line 510; VBG lines 742 795 797

Other information
- Fare zone: 121 (ZVV)

Services
Preceding station	Zurich S-Bahn	Following station
Oberglatt towards Schaffhausen	S9	Glattbrugg towards Uster
Oberglatt towards Niederweningen	S15	Glattbrugg towards Rapperswil
Oberglatt towards Bülach	SN9 Limited service	Glattbrugg towards Uster
Location
- Location within Switzerland Location within Canton of Zurich

Rümlang is a railway station in the municipality of Rümlang in the canton of Zurich, Switzerland. The station lies within fare zone 121 of the Zürcher Verkehrsverbund (ZVV) and served only by S-Bahn trains. It is located on the Oerlikon–Bülach line.

== Services ==
The railway station is served by Zurich S-Bahn lines S9 and S15. During weekends, there is also a nighttime S-Bahn service offered by ZVV. In summary:

- Zurich S-Bahn
  - S9/S15: service every fifteen minutes to Uster and every half-hour to Niederweningen, Rapperswil, and Schaffhausen.
  - Nighttime S-Bahn (only during weekends):
    - SN9: hourly service between Bülach and Uster via Zürich HB.

The station is additionally served by buses of Verkehrsbetriebe Glattal (VBG) and PostAuto.

== See also ==
- Rail transport in Switzerland
