= Kempten railway station (Switzerland) =

Railway station in Canton of Zürich, Switzerland

Kempten
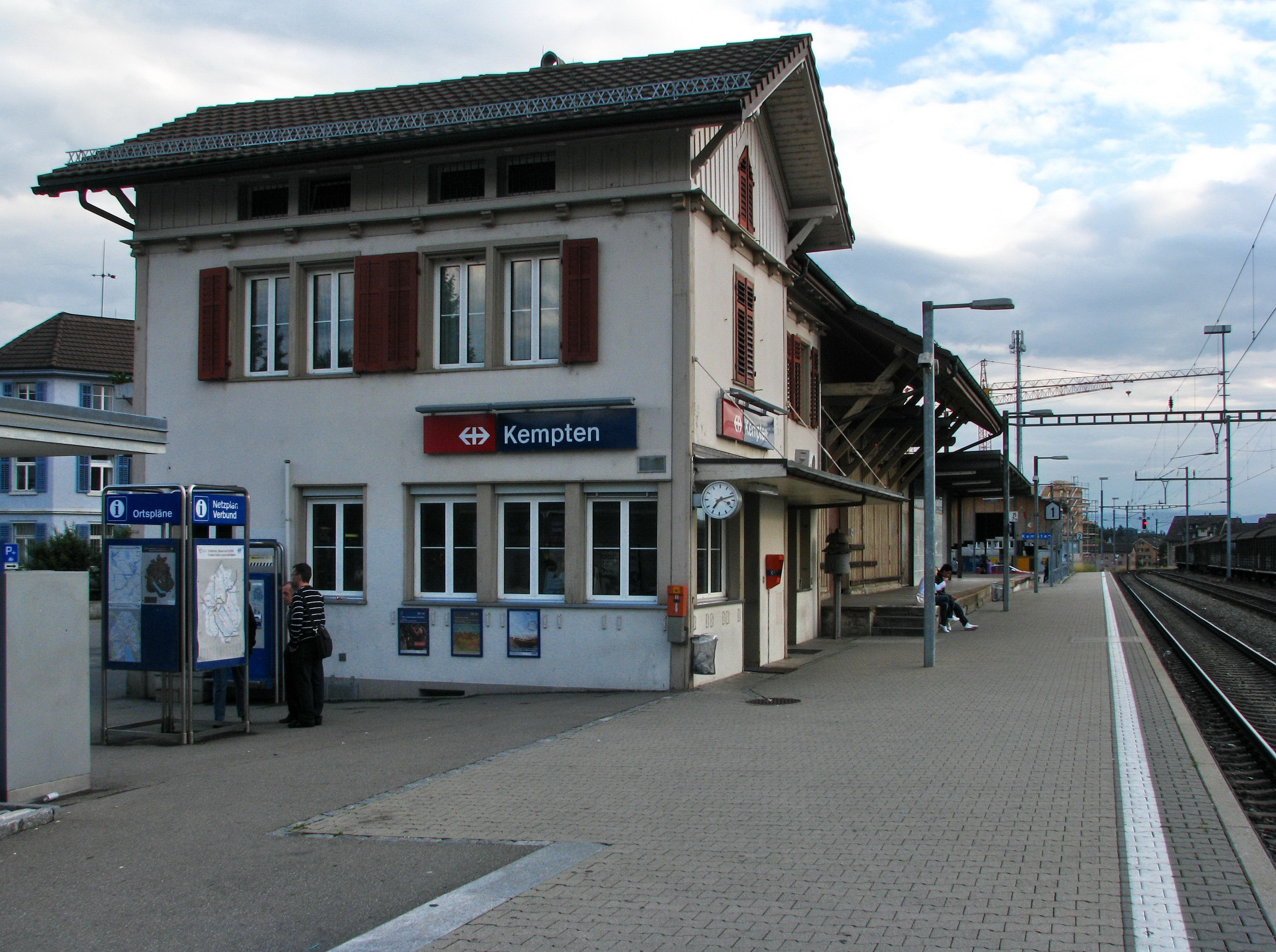
- Kempten station building

General information
- Location: Bahnhofstrasse, Kempten, Wetzikon, Canton of Zürich, Switzerland
- Coordinates: 47.331832°N 8.80419°E
- Elevation: 552 m (1,811 ft)
- Owner: Swiss Federal Railways
- Operator: Swiss Federal Railways
- Line: Effretikon–Hinwil line
- Platforms: 1 side platform
- Tracks: 3

Other information
- Fare zone: 132 (ZVV)

Passengers
- 2018: 2,100 per weekday

Services
Preceding station	Zurich S-Bahn	Following station
Pfäffikon ZH towards Bülach	S3	Wetzikon Terminus
Location
- Location within Switzerland Location within Canton of Zurich

Kempten is a railway station in the municipality of Wetzikon in the Oberland region of the canton of Zurich, Switzerland. The station takes its name from the nearby village of Kempten. It is located on the Effretikon to Hinwil railway line, within fare zone 132 of the Zürcher Verkehrsverbund (ZVV).

== Service ==
The station is served only by S-Bahn trains. It is an intermediated stop on Zurich S-Bahn line S3, which links Zürich Hardbrücke and Wetzikon via Zürich Stadelhofen and Effretikon. During peak hours, the S3 continues from Zürich Hardbrücke to Bülach.

- Zurich S-Bahn S3: half-hourly service to Zürich Hardbrücke (or Bülach during peak hour) via Zürich HB, and to Wetzikon.

== History ==
Between 1903 and 1939, Kempten station was also served by the Wetzikon-Meilen-Bahn (WMB), a metre gauge electric tramway that linked Kempten with Meilen, on the shores of Lake Zürich, via Wetzikon.

== See also ==
- Rail transport in Switzerland
