= Glattbrugg railway station =

Railway station in the Glattbrugg area of the Swiss municipality of Opfikon

Glattbrugg
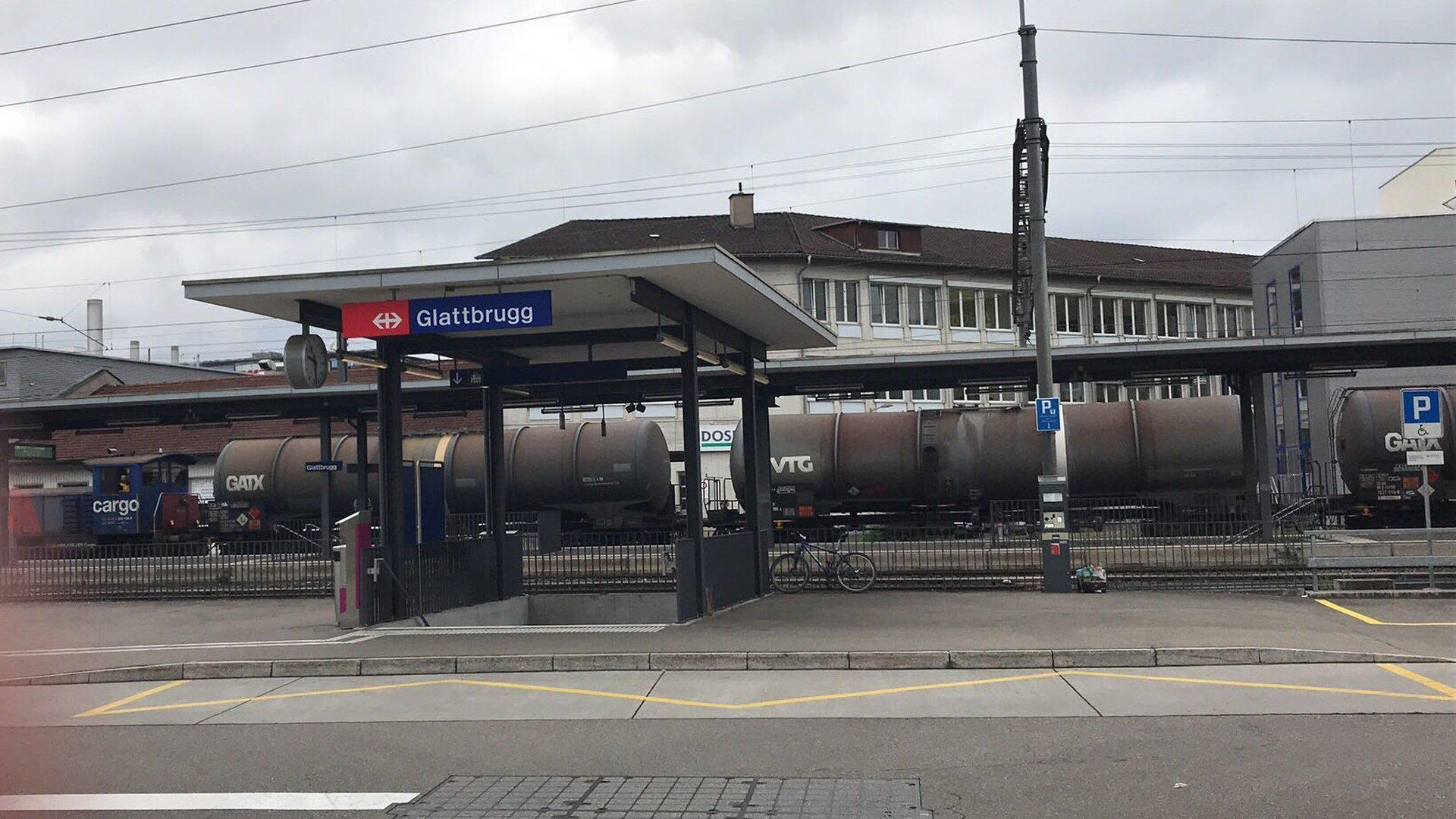
- The station entrance in 2018

General information
- Location: Opfikon, Zürich; Switzerland
- Coordinates: 47°25′51″N 8°33′32″E
- Elevation: 432 m (1,417 ft)
- Owner: Swiss Federal Railways
- Line: Oerlikon–Bülach line
- Distance: 7.3 km (4.5 mi) from Zürich Hauptbahnhof
- Platforms: 1 island platform
- Tracks: 3
- Train operators: Swiss Federal Railways
- Connections: ZVV: Bhf. Glattbrugg / Glattbrugg, Post
- Tram: VBZ/VBG trams 10 12
- Bus: VBG 761 762 768
- Airport: Glattalbahn 10 / 12 in 0:11h, and bus route 768 in 0:18h to/from Zurich Airport

Other information
- Fare zone: 121 (ZVV)

Services
Preceding station	Zurich S-Bahn	Following station
Oberglatt towards Bülach	S3	Zürich Oerlikon towards Wetzikon
Rümlang towards Schaffhausen	S9	Zürich Oerlikon towards Uster
Rümlang towards Niederweningen	S15	Zürich Oerlikon towards Rapperswil
Rümlang towards Bülach	SN9 Limited service	Zürich Oerlikon towards Uster
Location
- Location within Switzerland Location within Canton of Zürich

Glattbrugg railway station (German: Bahnhof Glattbrugg) is a railway station in Switzerland, in the Glattbrugg area of the municipality of Opfikon. The station is located on the main line of the Oerlikon–Bülach line and is an interchange point between the Zurich S-Bahn and the Stadtbahn Glattal light rail system. It lies within fare zone 121 of the Zürcher Verkehrsverbund (ZVV).

The station is served by S-Bahn lines S3, S9 and S15, and by Zurich tram routes 10 and 12, operating on behalf of the Stadtbahn Glattal. Glattbrugg station is some 250 metres (820 ft) walk from Opfikon station on S-Bahn line S7.

A large rail-served fuel depot is located to the west of the station, which is used to handle aviation fuel supplies to the nearby Zurich International Airport.

== Services ==
=== S-Bahn ===
The following S-Bahn services stop at Glattbrugg:

- Zurich S-Bahn
  - S3: rush-hour service between Bülach and Wetzikon
  - S9/S15: service every fifteen minutes to Uster and every half-hour to Niederweningen, Rapperswil, and Schaffhausen.

During weekends, there is also a nighttime S-Bahn service calling at Glattbrugg station, offered by ZVV:

- SN9: hourly service between Bülach and Uster via Zürich HB.

=== Tram / Bus ===
The following Zurich tram lines call in front of the station building (only selected stops are shown):

Line 10: (Löwenplatz (Note: Only boarding as this stop lies on the turning loop of the line. Bahnhofplatz/HB is the terminus in the opposite direction) –) Bahnhofplatz/HB – Central – ETH/Universitätsspital – Seilbahn Rigiblick – Milchbuck – Sternen Oerlikon – Bhf. Oerlikon Ost – Glattpark – Bhf. Glattbrugg – Bhf. Balsberg – Zurich Airport (Zurich)

Line 12: Stettbach – Glatt – Bhf. Wallisellen – Glattpark – Bhf. Glattbrugg – Bhf. Balsberg – Zurich Airport (Zurich)

In addition, there are three bus lines of Verkehrsbetriebe Glattal (VBG) serving Glattbrugg railway station. Bus routes 761 and 762 both depart near the station forecourt. Bus route 768 calls at the nearby bus stop Glattbrugg, Post.

== See also ==
- Rail transport in Switzerland
