= S3 (ZVV) =

Railway service in Switzerland

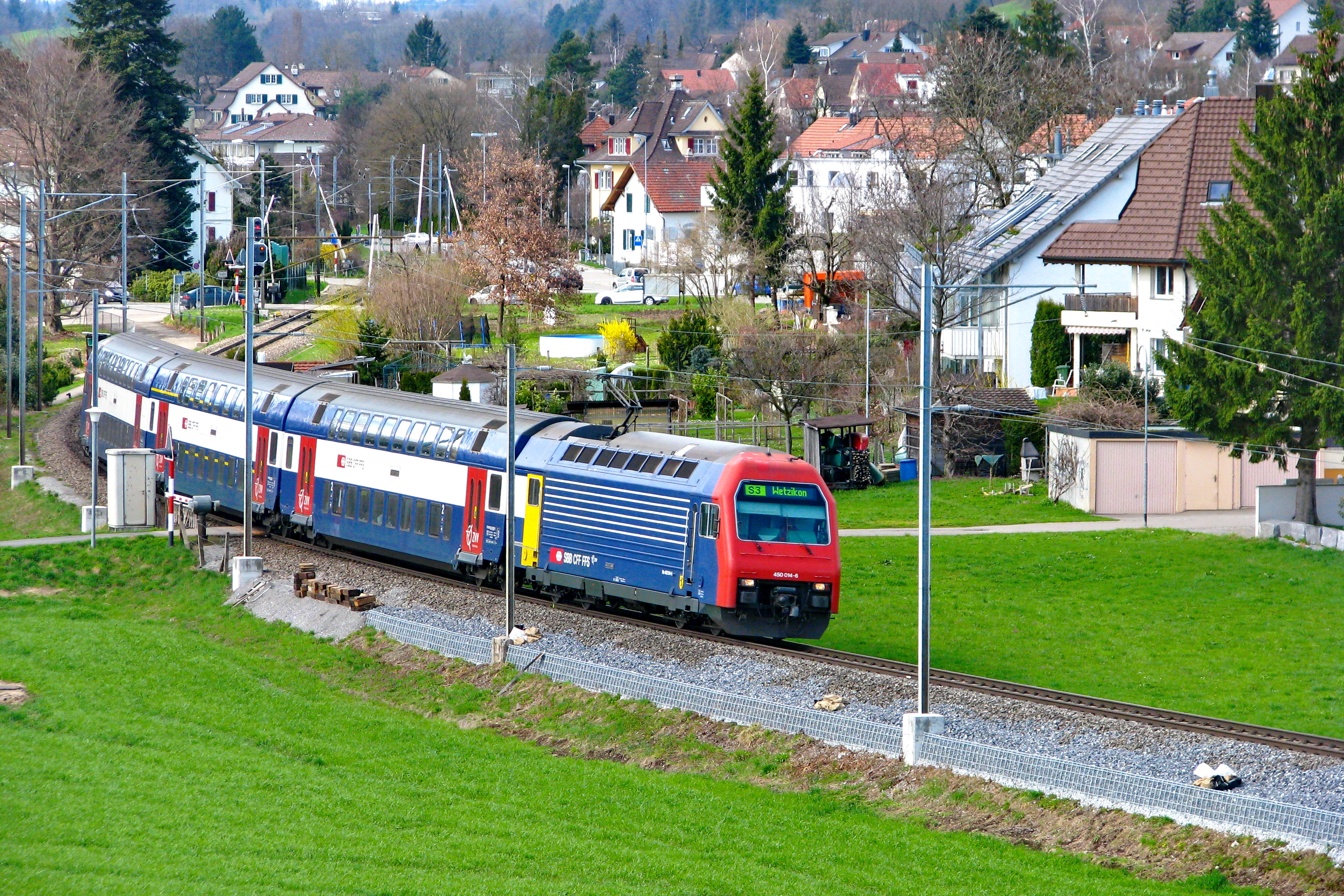
- S3 service passing Irgenhausen towards Wetzikon in 2010

Overview
- Service type: S-Bahn service
- Locale: Zürich S-Bahn
- Current operator(s): Swiss Federal Railways

Route
- Termini: Wetzikon; Bülach
- Stops: 15
- Service frequency: Every 30 minutes
- Line(s) used: Effretikon–Hinwil line; Zürich–Winterthur line; Oerlikon–Bülach line

Technical
- Rolling stock: Re 450 class; Double-decker coaches

The S3 is a regional railway service of the Zürich S-Bahn on the Zürcher Verkehrsverbund (ZVV), the Zürich transportation network. It is operated by Swiss Federal Railways.

Zürich S-Bahn network as of December 2018.

At Zürich HB, trains of the S3 service usually depart from underground tracks (Gleis) 41–44 (Museumstrasse station).

== Route ==
- S3 (Bülach–) Hardbrücke–Zürich HB–Effretikon–Wetzikon
  Extended from Hardbrücke to Bülach during rush hour, operating non-stop from Glattbrugg.

The core of the service links Wetzikon, in the east of the canton of Zürich, and Zürich Hardbrücke, in central Zürich. This core service runs via the Hinwil–Effretikon line, joining the Winterthur–Zürich line at Effretikon. It then runs via the Zürichberg Tunnel and stopping at Zürich Stadelhofen and Zurich Hauptbahnhof. During peak hours service continues north via the Oerlikon–Bülach railway to Bülach.

The following stations are served:

- Wetzikon
- Kempten
- Pfäffikon ZH
- Fehraltorf
- Illnau
- Effretikon
- Dietlikon
- Stettbach
- Zürich Stadelhofen
- Zürich Hauptbahnhof
- Zürich Hardbrücke
- Zürich Oerlikon
- Glattbrugg
- Oberglatt
- Bülach

== History ==
Up until December 2018, the S3 operated via the Zürich–Baden railway as far as Dietikon, instead of turning north to Bülach. Alternate trains continued further along the Zürich to Olten line, from Dietikon to Aarau, in the canton of Aargau. An extended S11 replaced the S3 between Hardbrücke and Aarau.

== Rolling stock ==
As of the December 2022 timetable change, all services are operated Re 450 class locomotives pushing or pulling double-deck passenger carriages.

== Scheduling ==
Over the core route between Wetzikon and Hardbrücke, the normal frequency is one train every 30 minutes. A limited number of trains operate to and from Bülach during peak hours. A journey over the full length of the service takes 60 minutes.

== See also ==
- Rail transport in Switzerland
- List of railway stations in Zurich
- Public transport in Zurich
- ZVV fare zones
