= Oberglatt railway station =

Railway station in Switzerland

Oberglatt
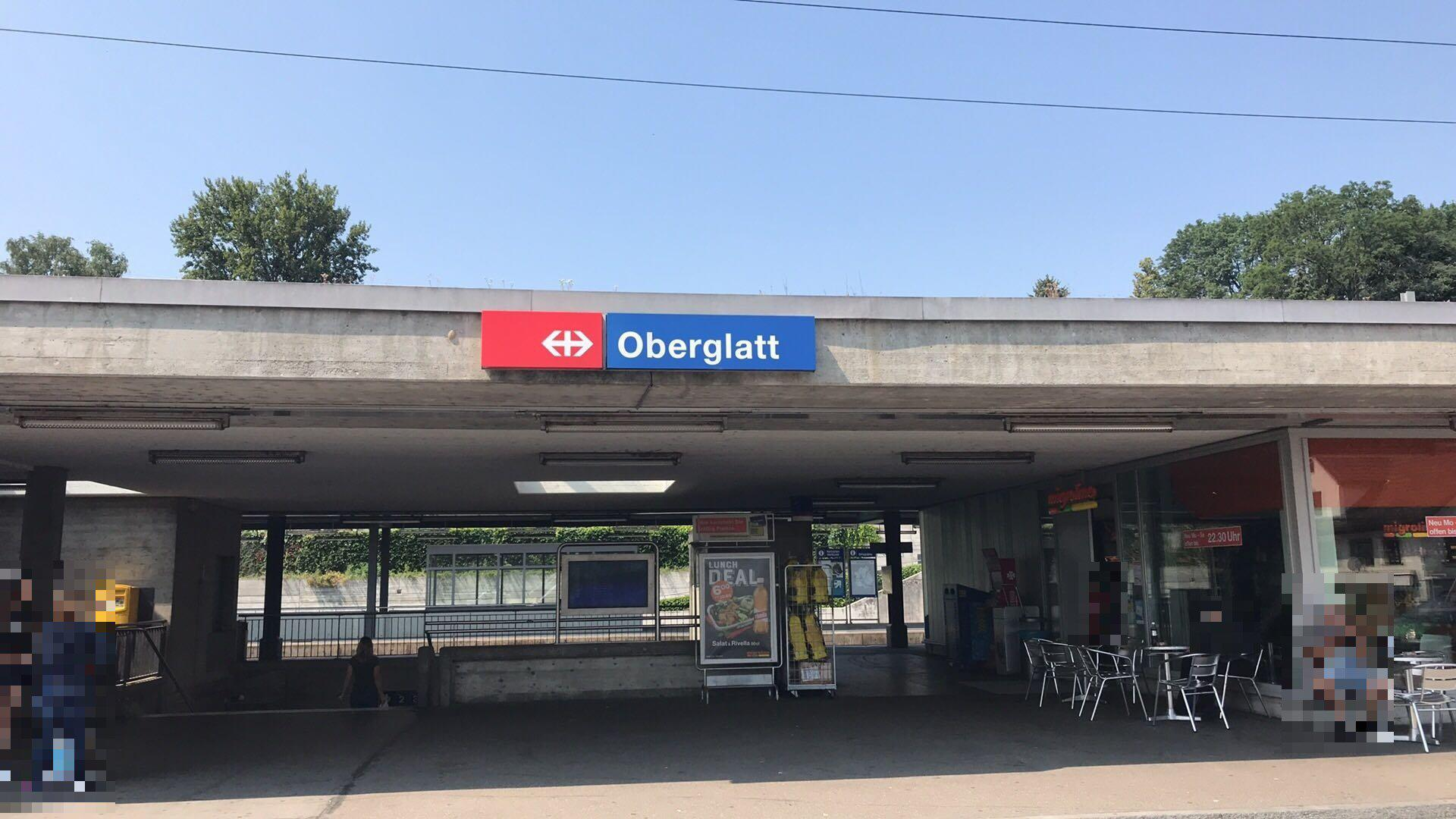
- The station in 2018

General information
- Location: Kaiserstuhlstrasse; Oberglatt; Switzerland
- Coordinates: 47°28′13″N 8°30′38″E
- Elevation: 430 m (1,410 ft)
- Owner: Swiss Federal Railways
- Lines: Oerlikon–Bülach line; Wehntal line
- Distance: 13.1 km (8.1 mi) from Zürich Hauptbahnhof
- Platforms: 1 island platform, 1 side platform
- Tracks: 3
- Train operators: Swiss Federal Railways
- Connections: Zurich Transport Network (ZVV)
- Bus: PostAuto lines 504 510 525 535

Other information
- Fare zone: 121 (ZVV)

Passengers
- 2018: 7,600 per weekday

Services
Preceding station	Zurich S-Bahn	Following station
Bülach Terminus	S3	Glattbrugg towards Wetzikon
Niederglatt towards Schaffhausen	S9	Rümlang towards Uster
Niederhasli towards Niederweningen	S15	Rümlang towards Rapperswil
Niederglatt towards Bülach	SN9 Limited service	Rümlang towards Uster
Location
- Location within Switzerland Location within Canton of Zurich

Oberglatt railway station is a railway station in the municipality of Oberglatt in the canton of Zurich, Switzerland, within fare zone 121 of the Zürcher Verkehrsverbund (ZVV). It is located at the junction of the standard gauge Oerlikon–Bülach and Wehntal lines of Swiss Federal Railways, and is served only by S-Bahn trains.

== Services ==
The railway station is served by Zurich S-Bahn lines S3 (rush-hour only), S9, and S15. During weekends, there is also a nighttime S-Bahn service offered by ZVV. In summary:

- Zurich S-Bahn
  - S3: rush-hour service between Bülach and Wetzikon
  - S9/S15: service every fifteen minutes to Uster and every half-hour to Niederweningen, Rapperswil, and Schaffhausen
  - Nighttime S-Bahn (only during weekends):
    - SN9: hourly service between Bülach and Uster via Zürich HB

The station is additionally served by PostAuto buses.

== See also ==
- Rail transport in Switzerland
