= Niederglatt railway station =

Railway station in Niederglatt, Switzerland

Niederglatt
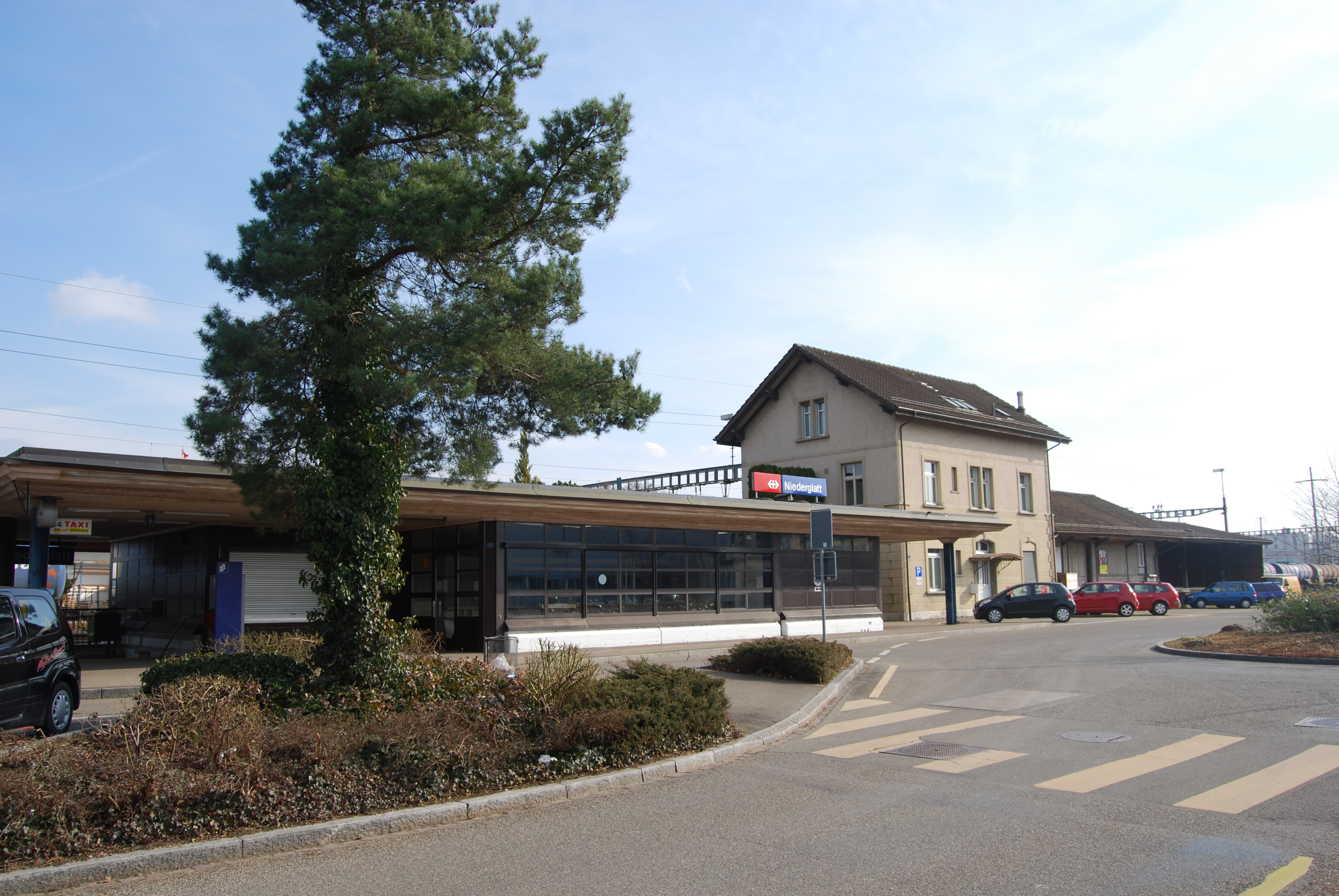
- The railway station in 2011

General information
- Location: Bahnhofstrasse; Niederglatt; Zurich; Switzerland
- Coordinates: 47.48603°N 8.50258°E
- Elevation: 424 m (1,391 ft)
- Owner: Swiss Federal Railways
- Operator: Swiss Federal Railways
- Line: Bülach-Regensberg Railway (Bülach branch)
- Platforms: 1 island platform
- Tracks: 7

Other information
- Fare zone: 112 (ZVV)

Services
Preceding station	Zurich S-Bahn	Following station
Bülach towards Schaffhausen	S9	Oberglatt towards Uster
Bülach Terminus	SN9 Limited service	Oberglatt towards Uster
Location
- Location within Switzerland Location within Canton of Zurich

Niederglatt is a railway station in the municipality of Niederglatt in the canton of Zurich, Switzerland. It is located on the Bülach branch of the Bülach-Regensberg Railway and within fare zone 112 of the Zürcher Verkehrsverbund (ZVV).

== Services ==
The railway station served by Zurich S-Bahn line S9. During weekends, there is also a nighttime S-Bahn service offered by ZVV. In summary:

- Zurich S-Bahn
  - S9: service every half-hour to Uster and Schaffhausen.
  - Nighttime S-Bahn (only during weekends):
    - SN9: hourly service between Bülach and Uster via Zürich HB.

== History ==
Niederglatt was the junction for the former Niederglatt-Otelfingen railway line, which once connected with Otelfingen station on the Furttal line but closed to through trains in 1937. The first 6.5 kilometres (4.0 mi) of the line, from Niederglatt as far as the Tanklager Mettmenhasli, has been retained as a siding, and joins the main line just to the south of the station.

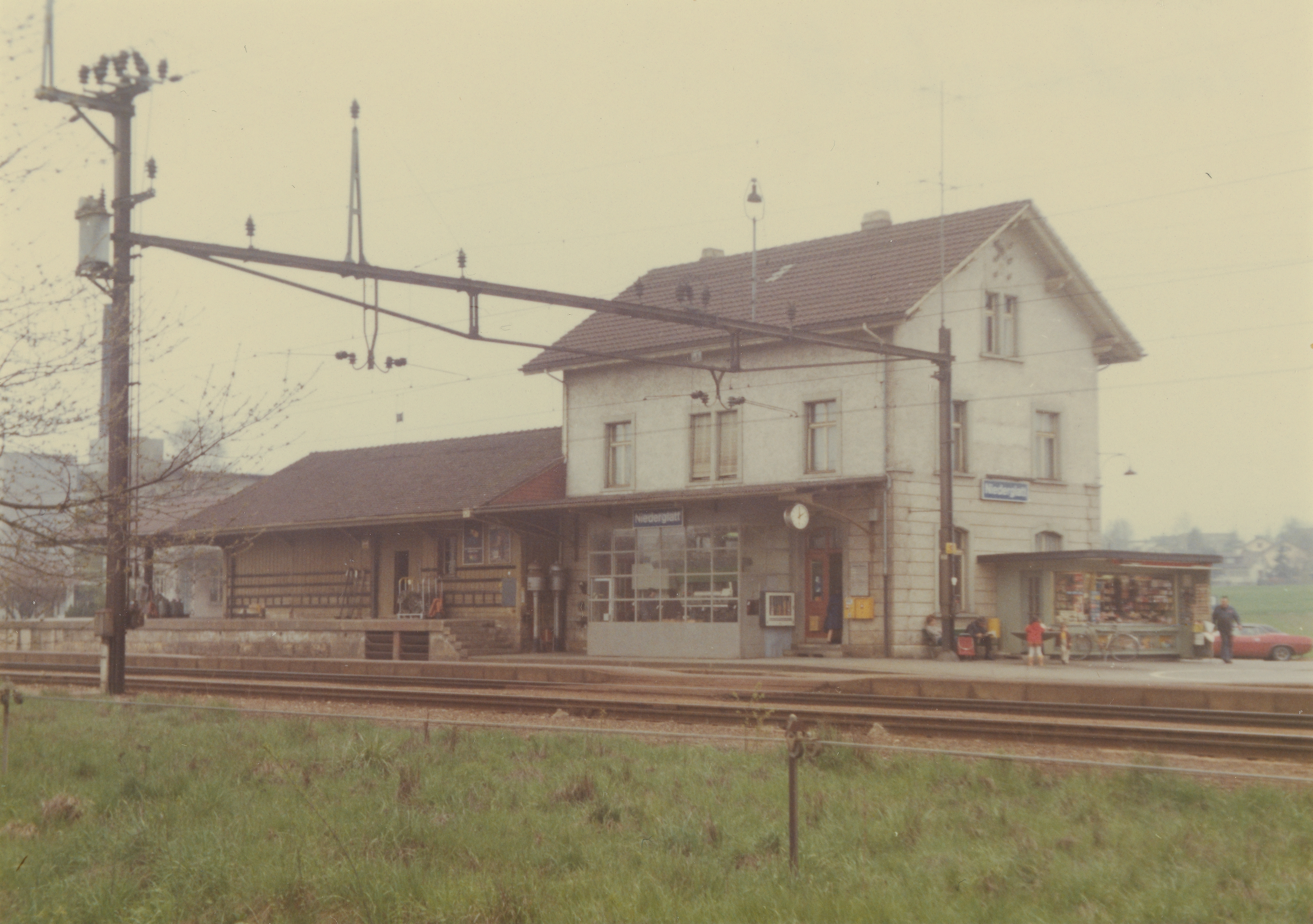
Station building ca. 1975

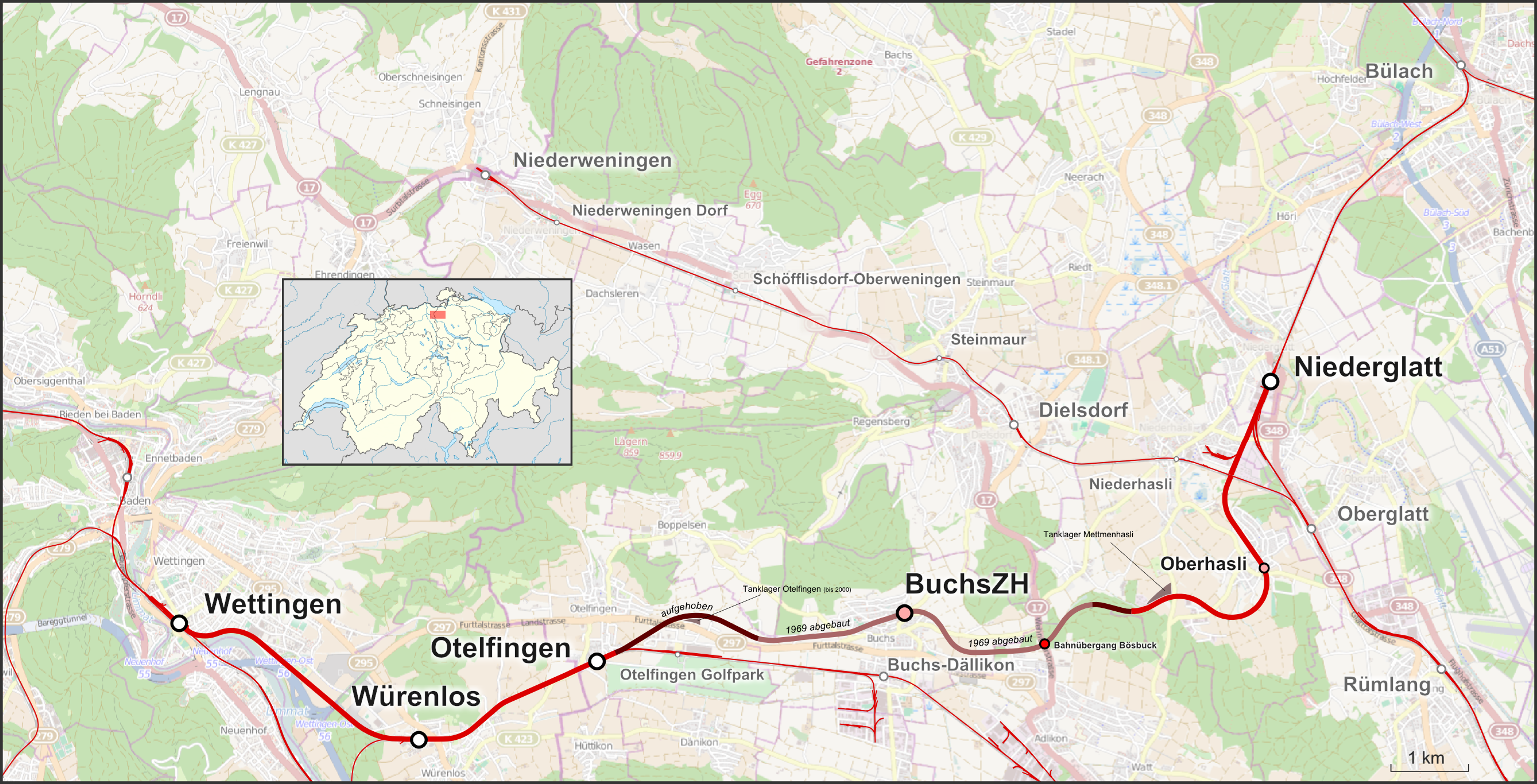
The former Niederglatt-Otelfingen railway line

== See also ==
- Rail transport in Switzerland
