= List of busiest railway stations in Switzerland =

This is a list of the busiest railway stations in Switzerland, based on statistics and data received on the year of 2024 by the Swiss Federal Railways. In this list, all stations can be considered as major stations or hubs, as well as stations serving major cities, large towns, or in some occasions, airports. Most of the stations listed below serve many long-distance services, with the busiest of them even serving international train services.

| Rank | Station | Annual entries/exits (millions) | Number of platforms | City | Canton | Image |
|---|---|---|---|---|---|---|
| 1 | Zürich Hauptbahnhof | 144.0 | 26 | Zürich | Canton of Zürich | |
| 2 | Bern railway station | 102.9 | 19 | Bern | Canton of Bern | |
| 3 | Geneva railway station | 60.3 | 8 | Geneva | Canton of Geneva | |
| 4 | Lucerne railway station | 53.5 | 14 | Lucerne | Canton of Lucerne | |
| 5 | Basel SBB railway station | 49.5 | 22 | Basel | Kanton Basel-Stadt | |
| 6 | Winterthur railway station | 44.9 | 9 | Winterthur | Canton of Zürich | |
| 7 | Lausanne railway station | 43.0 | 7 | Lausanne | Canton de Vaud | |
| 8 | Zürich Oerlikon railway station | 37.7 | 8 | Zürich | Canton of Zürich | |
| 9 | Zürich Stadelhofen railway station | 27.6 | 3 | Zürich | Canton of Zürich | |
| 10 | St. Gallen railway station | 26.4 | 9 | St. Gallen | Canton of St. Gallen | |
| 11 | Aarau railway station | 25.7 | 10 | Aarau | Canton of Aargau | |
| 12 | Olten railway station | 23.0 | 10 | Olten | Canton of Solothurn | |
| 13 | Biel/Bienne railway station | 22.5 | 11 | Biel/Bienne | Canton of Bern | |
| 14 | Zürich Altstetten railway station | 21.7 | 5 | Zürich | Canton of Zürich | |
| 15 | Zug railway station | 20.0 | 7 | Zug | Canton of Zug | |
| 16 | Baden railway station | 19.1 | 5 | Baden | Aargau | |
| 17 | Zürich Hardbrücke railway station | 16.2 | 4 | Zürich | Canton of Zürich | |
| 18 | Geneva Airport railway station | 16.1 | 4 | Le Grand-Saconnex | Canton of Geneva | |
| 19 | Chur railway station | 14.0 | 12 | Chur | Grisons | |
| 20 | Thun railway station | 13.7 | 7 | Thun | Canton of Bern | |
| 21 | Lugano railway station | 11.6 | 4 | Lugano | Ticino | |
| 22 | Fribourg/Freiburg railway station | 10.8 | 5 | Fribourg | Canton of Fribourg | |
| 23 | Neuchâtel railway station | 9.7 | 7 | Neuchâtel | Canton of Neuchâtel | |
| 24 | Uster railway station | 9.6 | 3 | Uster | Canton of Zürich | |
| 25 | Zürich Enge railway station | 7.7 | 3 | Zürich | Canton of Zürich | |
| 26 | Bellinzona railway station | 5.5 | 5 | Bellinzona | Ticino | |

== See also ==
- Rail transport in Switzerland
