= Bülach railway station =

Railway station in Switzerland

Bülach
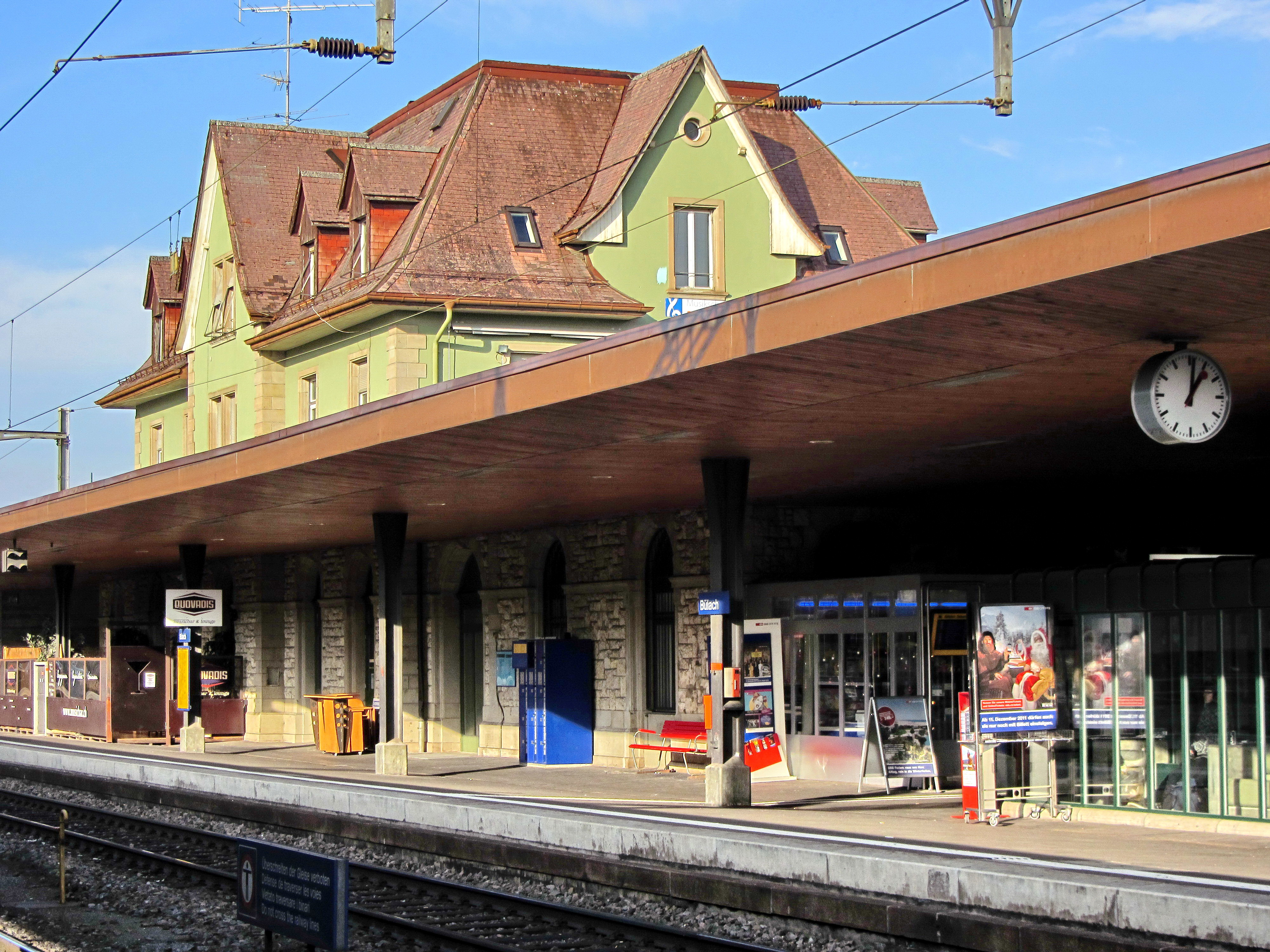
- The station in 2011

General information
- Location: Bülach, canton of Zurich; Switzerland
- Coordinates: 47°31′26″N 8°32′10″E
- Elevation: 428 m (1,404 ft)
- Owner: Swiss Federal Railways
- Lines: Oerlikon–Bülach line; Winterthur–Bülach–Koblenz line
- Distance: 16.3 km (10.1 mi) from Winterthur; 20.3 km (12.6 mi) from Zürich HB
- Platforms: 3 island platforms (one with the station building); 2 side platforms
- Tracks: 6
- Train operators: Swiss Federal Railways; Thurbo
- Connections: Zurich Transport Network (ZVV)
- Bus: PostAuto lines 501 504 515 525 530 531 535

Other information
- Fare zone: 112 (ZVV)

Passengers
- 2025: 15,600 per day (SBB, Thurbo)
- Rank: 55 out of 1,095 (Note: Tied with Solothurn railway station.)

Services
Preceding station	SBB CFF FFS	Following station
Schaffhausen Terminus	RE48	Zürich Oerlikon towards Zürich HB
Preceding station	Zurich S-Bahn	Following station
Terminus	S3	Oberglatt towards Wetzikon
Glattfelden towards Schaffhausen	S9	Niederglatt towards Uster
Eglisau towards Waldshut	S36	Terminus
Terminus	S41	Embrach-Rorbas towards Winterthur
Terminus	SN9 Limited service	Niederglatt towards Uster
Terminus	SN41 Limited service	Embrach-Rorbas towards Winterthur
Glattfelden towards Schaffhausen	SN65 Limited service	Terminus
Location
- Location within Switzerland Location within Canton of Zurich

Bülach railway station (German: Bahnhof Bülach) is a railway station in the municipality of Bülach in the canton of Zurich, Switzerland, situated within fare zone 112 of the Zürcher Verkehrsverbund (ZVV). It is located at the junction of the Winterthur to Koblenz and Oerlikon to Bülach lines of Swiss Federal Railways.

== Layout ==
Bülach is a junction station and an example of a Keilbahnhof: platforms 1–3 are located on the Oerlikon–Bülach line to the west of the station, while platforms 4–6 are located on the Winterthur–Koblenz line, to the east. The two lines join immediately north of the station facility.

== Services ==
As of the December 2020 timetable change, Bülach station is served by Zurich S-Bahn lines S3, S9, S36 and S41; as well as an hourly RegioExpress (RE48) service between Zurich and Schaffhausen (via Oerlikon). The S9 connects Zurich and Rafz/Schaffhausen, using the Bülach-Regensberg Railway south of Bülach and the Eglisau-Neuhausen railway line north of Eglisau, passing through German territory. The S36 connects Koblenz, while the S41 connects Winterthur using the Winterthur–Bülach–Koblenz railway line. InterCity and Cisalpino trains used to call at Bülach station until 2013.

Summary of rail services:

- RE48: hourly service between Zürich HB and Schaffhausen.
- Zurich S-Bahn:
  - S3: rush-hour service to Wetzikon.
  - S9: half-hourly service between Uster and Rafz; every other train continues from Rafz to Schaffhausen.
  - S36: hourly service to Waldshut.
  - S41: half-hourly service to Winterthur.

During weekends, there are also three Nighttime S-Bahn services (SN9, SN41, SN65) offered by ZVV.

- SN9: hourly service to Uster (via Zürich HB).
- SN41: hourly service to Winterthur (via Embrach-Rorbas).
- SN65: hourly service to Schaffhausen (via Rafz).

The station is additionally served by PostAuto buses.

== Gallery ==
Aerial view of the station (1923)

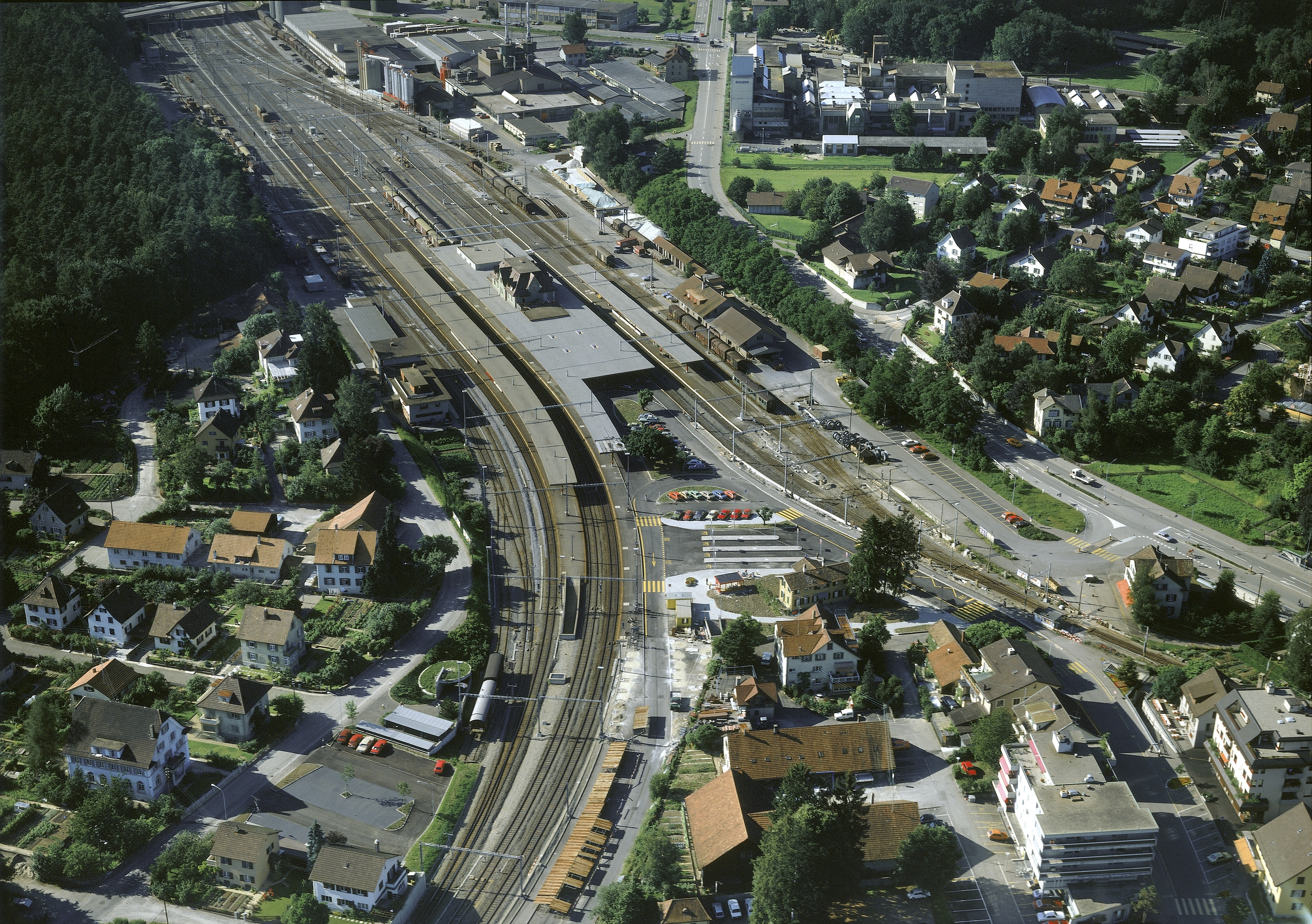
Aerial view (1980) of the station (Keilbahnhof), with lines continuing to Eglisau (top), Zürich HB (left) and Winterthur (right)

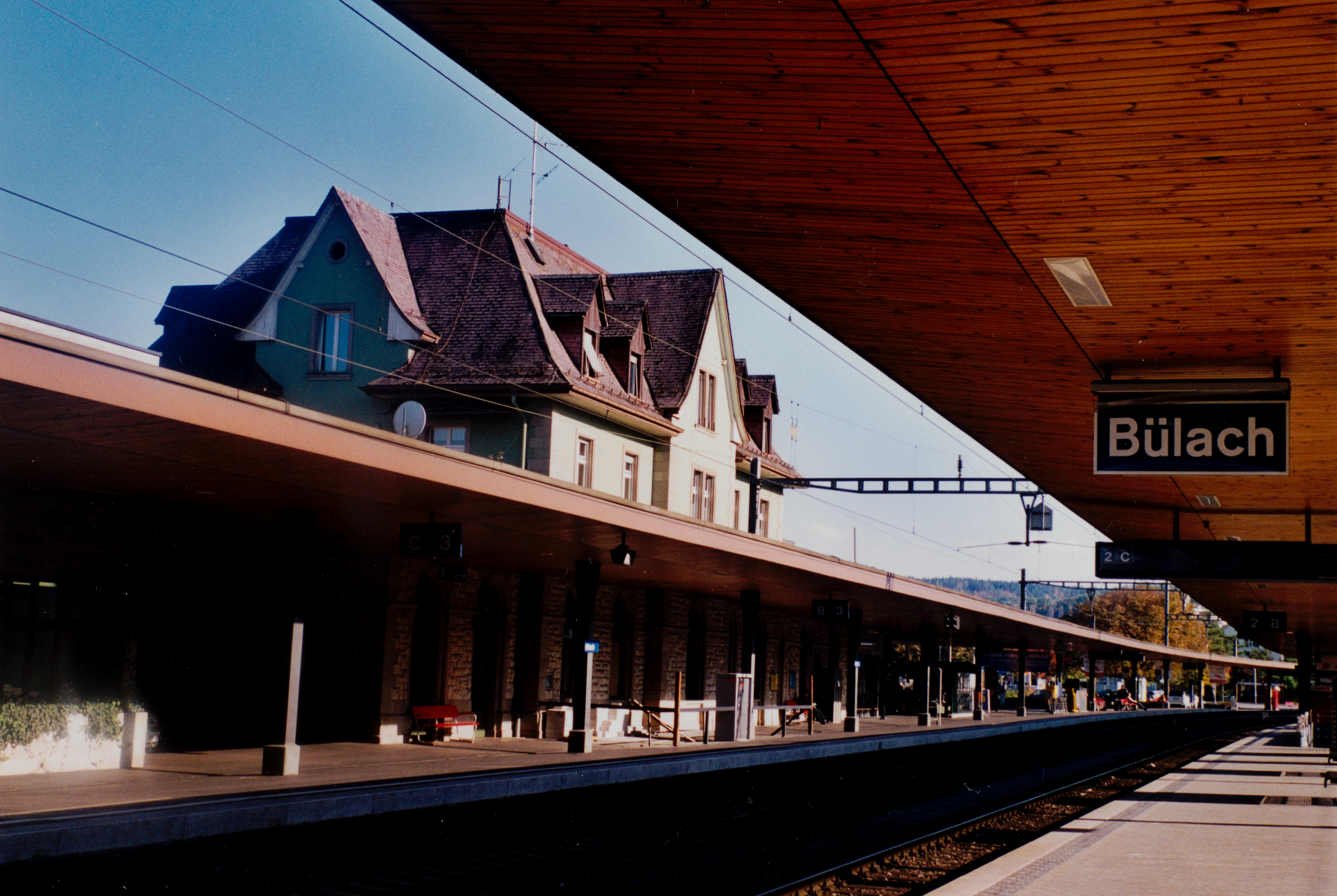
Platforms and reception building

== See also ==
- Rail transport in Switzerland
