= Oerlikon–Bülach railway line =

Railway line in Switzerland

Oerlikon–Bülach
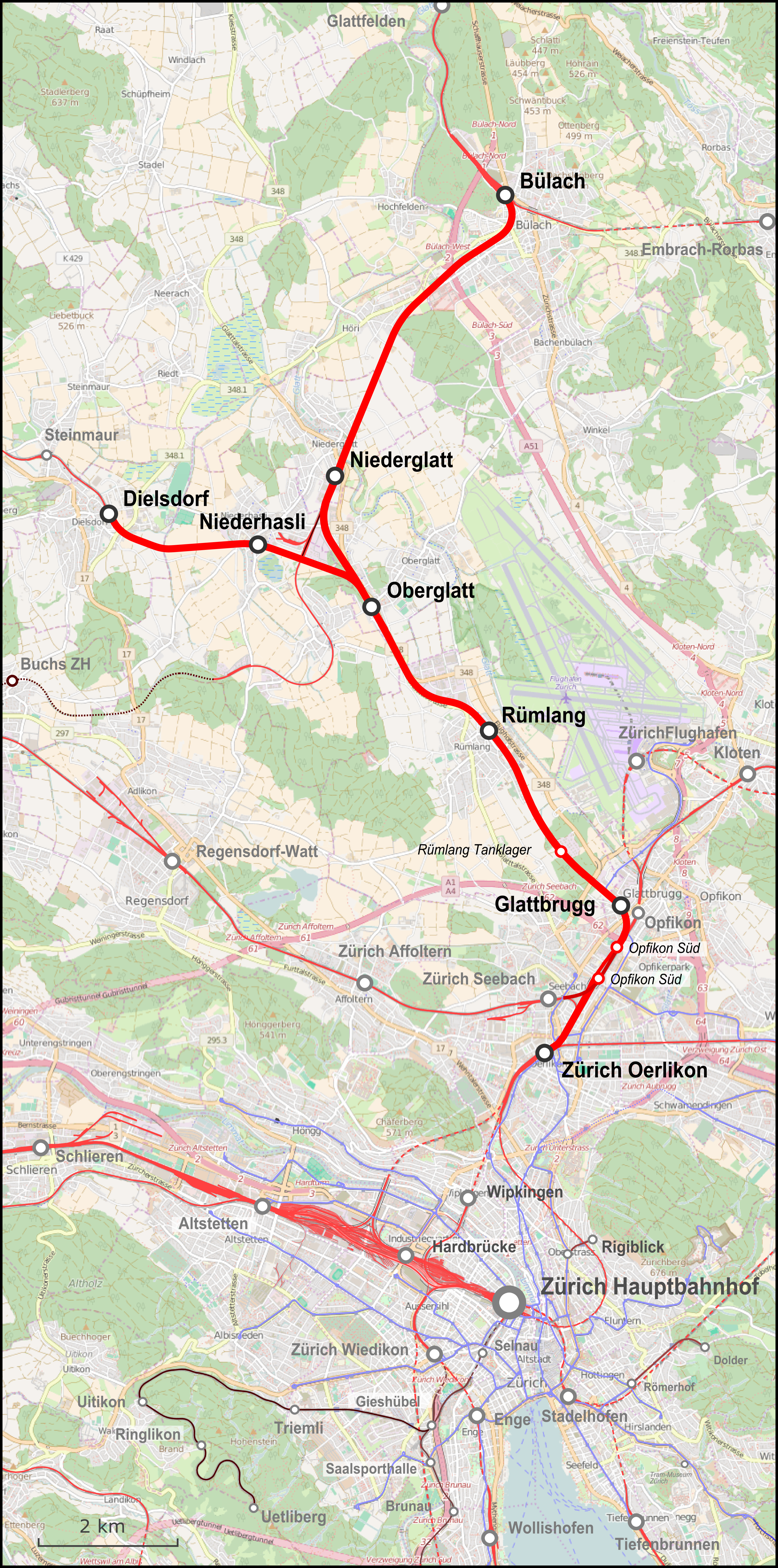

Overview
- Owner: Swiss Federal Railways
- Line number: 760
- Termini: Zürich Oerlikon; Bülach

Technical
- Line length: 15.54 km (9.66 mi)
- Number of tracks: 2 (main line)
- Track gauge: 1,435 mm (4 ft 8 1/2 in) standard gauge
- Electrification: 15 kV/16.7 Hz AC overhead catenary
- Maximum incline: 1.0%

The Oerlikon–Bülach railway is a standard-gauge railway line to the north of Zürich, Switzerland. It was built by the Bülach-Regensberg Railway (German: Bülach-Regensberg-Bahn, BR). It is also called the Y-shaped railway (German: Gabeleisenbahn) in German or the "potato railway" (German: Herdöpfelbahn) in Swiss German because its main freight traffic was potatoes. It was taken over by the Swiss Northeastern Railway on 1 January 1877.

On 1 May 1865, the BR opened its approximately 16 km-long Oerlikon–Oberglatt–Bülach main line and its just over 4 km-long Oberglatt–Dielsdorf branch line, which later became part of the Wehntal Railway (Wehntalbahn).

== History ==
In 1860, committees were formed in both the districts of Bülach and Regensberg, which was a former Landvogtei ("outer bailiwick") of Zurich, which had been abolished in 1798. These committees advocated a connection from each district to Oerlikon near Zurich. The committees also contacted the Swiss Northeastern Railway (Schweizerische Nordostbahn; NOB) and the canton to implement their ideas. In the initial phase, it was considered whether to operate the shorter branch line from Oberglatt to Dielsdorf with horse-hauled trains, while the Oberglatt to Bülach line would be operated by steam. Because of the greater time savings, it was eventually decided to build the branch to Dielsdorf for steam operations.

On 1 July 1863, the Cantonal Council of Zürich awarded a concession for the construction of the Y-shaped line from Bülach and Dielsdorf via Oberglatt to Oerlikon and approved the construction contract. The costs for the construction of the railway were equally borne by the canton of Zürich, the municipalities and the Northeastern Railway.

Construction began in the spring of 1864 and was divided into five lots. Because of insolvency and disputes with the construction companies, the construction had to be temporarily stopped. To ensure completion according to the concession of May 1865, the NOB intervened and carried out the construction of the substructure using piece work.

A small locomotive shed was built in both Dielsdorf and Bülach and a turntable with associated drainage pit was also built in Bülach. The whole one-track line had only a few engineering structures.

The lines were officially opened on 30 April 1865. An opening train went first from Oerlikon directly to Bülach, then back to Oberglatt and following a reversal to Dielsdorf.

The company officially started operations on 1 May 1865. Three pairs of trains ran from Dielsdorf and Bülach daily to and from Zurich and from Dielsdorf to Bülach and vice versa. On Sundays, additional trains operated from Bülach via Oberglatt to Dielsdorf and from Dielsdorf via Oberglatt to Zurich. Around 86% of travelers used 3rd class tickets and the remaining passengers used 2nd class tickets.

The BR and its lines were absorbed into the Northeastern Railway on 1 January 1877.

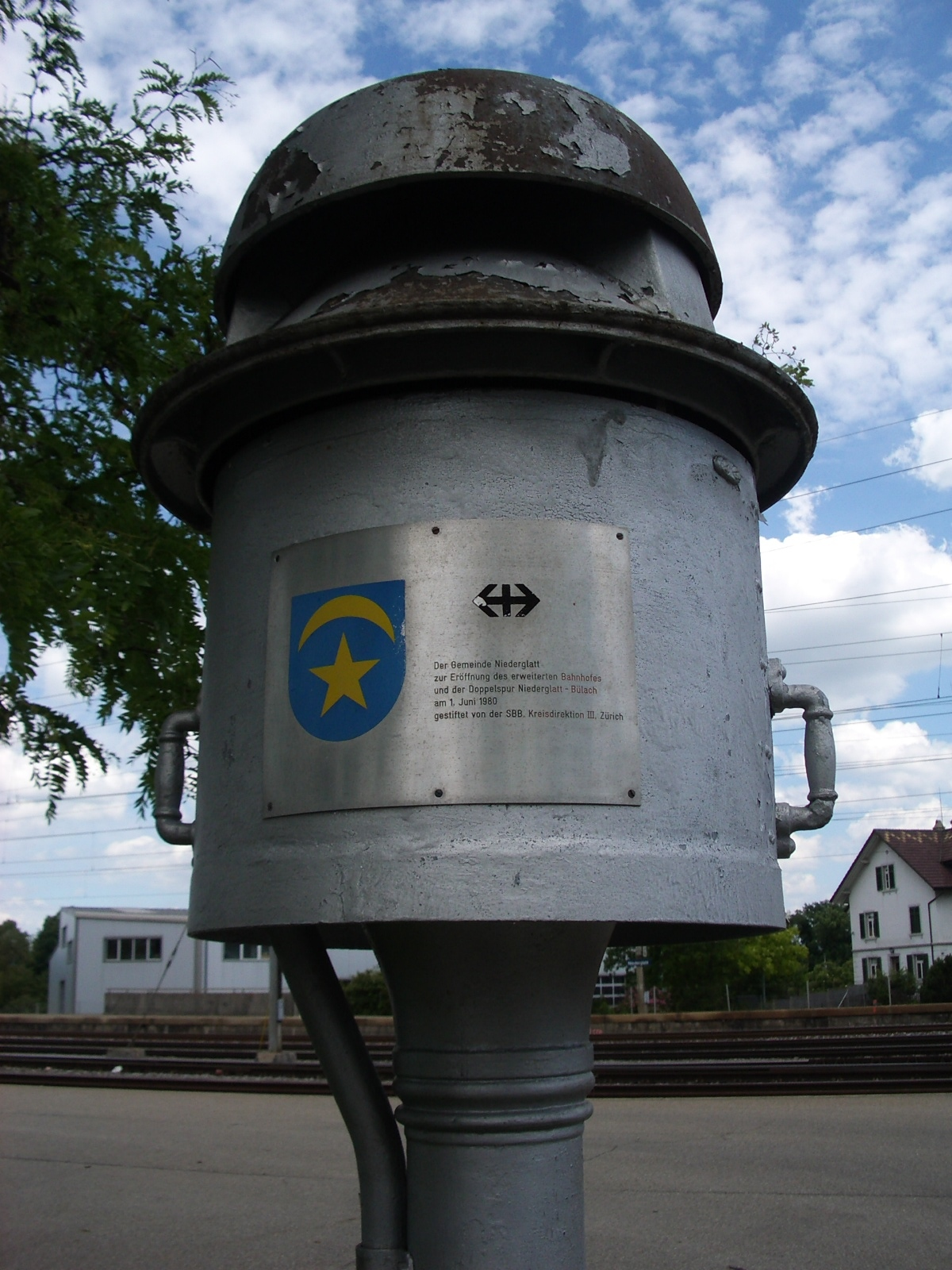
SBB signalling bell on the double track section between Niederglatt and Bülach in about 1980

=== Rolling stock ===
- 4 two-axle tender locomotives built by Krauss
- 12 passenger coaches
- 30 freight wagons

== Oerlikon–Bülach railway ==
The Oerlikon–Bülach railway is now operated as part of the international route from Zürich via Bülach and Schaffhausen to Germany and used by freight trains and long-distance passenger trains. Regional traffic has been operated since 27 May 1990 as part of the Zürich S-Bahn.

=== Development of the Oerlikon–Bülach railway ===
The Oerlikon–Bülach railway had a rail connection to the Winterthur–Koblenz railway line of the NOB in Bülach from 1 August 1876. This was significant because the NOB opened the Eglisau–Neuhausen line on 1 June 1897, making the Oerlikon–Bülach section part of the main connection between Zürich HB and Schaffhausen. The NOB was nationalised as of 1 January 1902 along with its lines and became part of the Swiss Federal Railways.

Under the SBB, the Oerlikon–Bülach line was electrified as part of the whole line to Schaffhausen. Electrical operations at 15 kV 16 2/3 Hz AC on the line commenced on 15 December 1928.

The duplication of the line took place in five small sections under the SBB: the Oerlikon–Glattbrugg double track was opened on 30 September 1979 and the Niederglatt–Bülach double track followed on 1 June 1980. Then followed the Oberglatt–Niederglatt double track on 25 September 1983, the Glattbrugg–Rümlang section on 28 August 1984 and finally the commissioning of the Rümlang–Oberglatt double track on 3 April 1985; since then the line has been consistently double-track.

=== Upgrade of the line in Oberhauserriet ===
Construction work began in the mid-1970s in the Oberhauserriet area, as a result of which the approximately two and a half kilometre-long section between Oerlikon and Opfikon has changed profoundly. This section includes the single-track Oerlikon–Glattbrugg line (from 1865), the Oerlikon–Schärenmoos (near Opfikon) line (from 1881) with the associated connecting curves of Oerlikon–Seebach (from 1909) and Seebach–Schärenmoos (1877–1909, reactivated in 1939) and the Seebach substation and converter of the SBB, which supplies the Zürich rail junction with traction current. Since the reconstruction, there have been six tracks arranged as the Oerlikon–Glattbrugg and Oerlikon–Opfikon–Riet double-track lines (with separately managed tracks) as well as the new double-track airport line between Oerlikon and the Dorfnest passing loop at Kloten. A seventh track was built for freight trains as part of the access route to the Limmattal marshalling yard and replaced the former Seebach–Schärenmoos connecting curve. Opfikon station replaced Schärenmoos station on the line to Kloten. Most of the new system of tracks were taken into service on 30 September 1979 and the airport line followed on 1 June 1980.

== Oberglatt–Dielsdorf railway ==
The branch line from Oberglatt to Dielsdorf was extended by the NOB on 12 August 1891 as part of the so-called Wehntalbahn (Wehntal Railway) to Niederweningen. The Wehntal Railway was the second-last line of the SBB with commercial passenger traffic to be electrified with electric operations beginning on 28 May 1960. Most sidings were removed in the 1980s and since then train crossings on the single-track line can only be made at Dielsdorf. The line is served by regional traffic and, since 27 May 1990, only by Zürich S-Bahn services.
